= Liver injury =

Form of trauma sustained to the liver

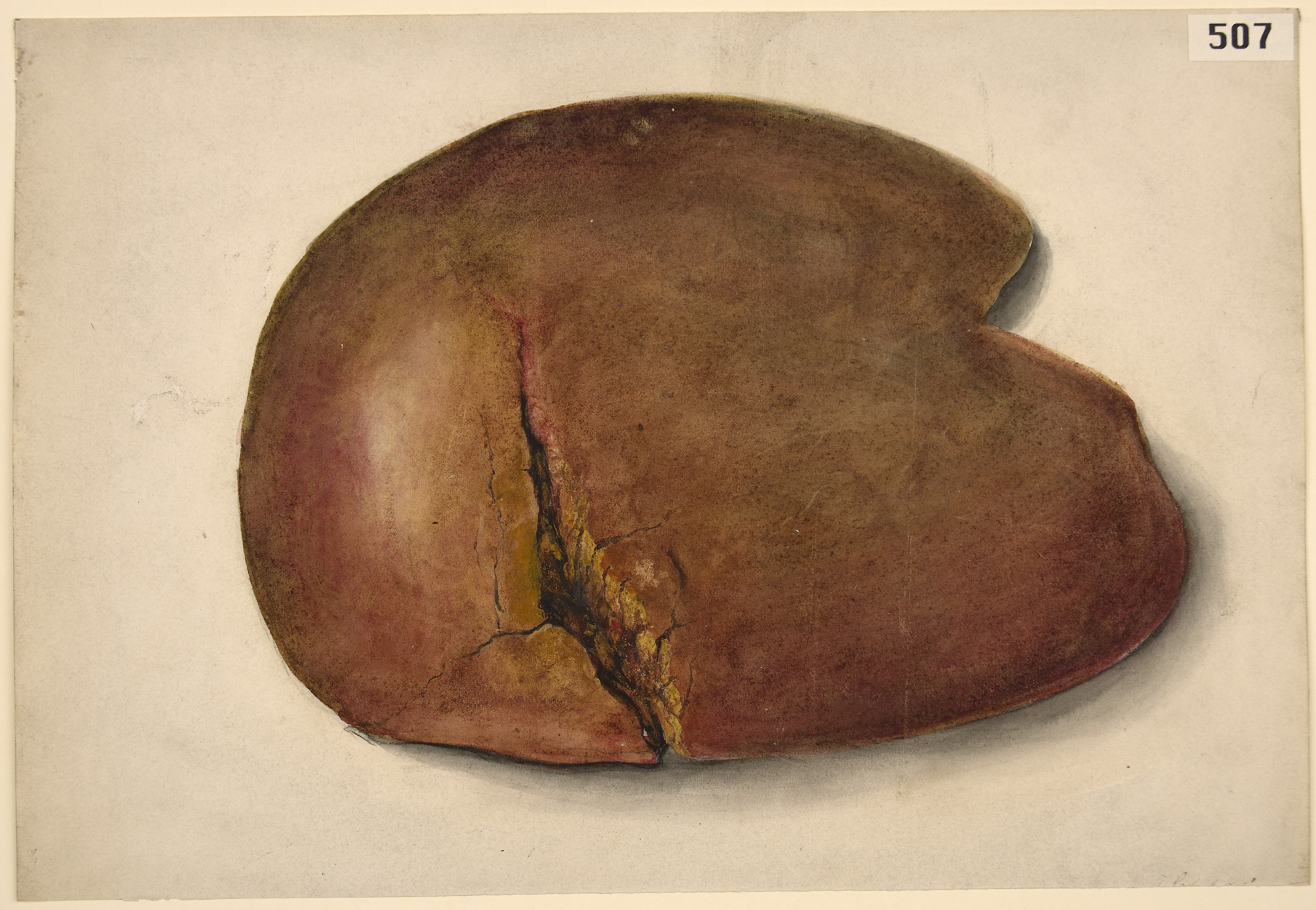
- A watercolour painting of a liver with extensive rupturing caused by blunt trauma to the abdomen.
- Specialty: Emergency medicine, general surgery

A liver injury, also known as liver laceration, is some form of trauma sustained to the liver. This can occur through either a blunt force such as a car accident, or a penetrating foreign object such as a knife. Liver injuries constitute 5% of all traumas, making it the most common abdominal injury. Generally nonoperative management and observation is all that is required for a full recovery.

== Cause ==
Given its anterior position in the abdominal cavity and its large size, the liver is prone to gun shot wounds and stab wounds. Its firm location under the diaphragm also makes it especially prone to shearing forces. Common causes of this type of injury are blunt force mechanisms such as motor vehicle accidents, falls, and sports injuries. Typically these blunt forces dissipate through and around the structure of the liver and causes irreparable damage to the internal microarchitecture of the tissue. With increasing velocity of the impact, the internal damage of the liver tissue also exemplifies - even though the tissue itself is mechanically and micro-structurally isotropic. A large majority of people who sustain this injury also have another accompanying injury.

== Diagnosis ==
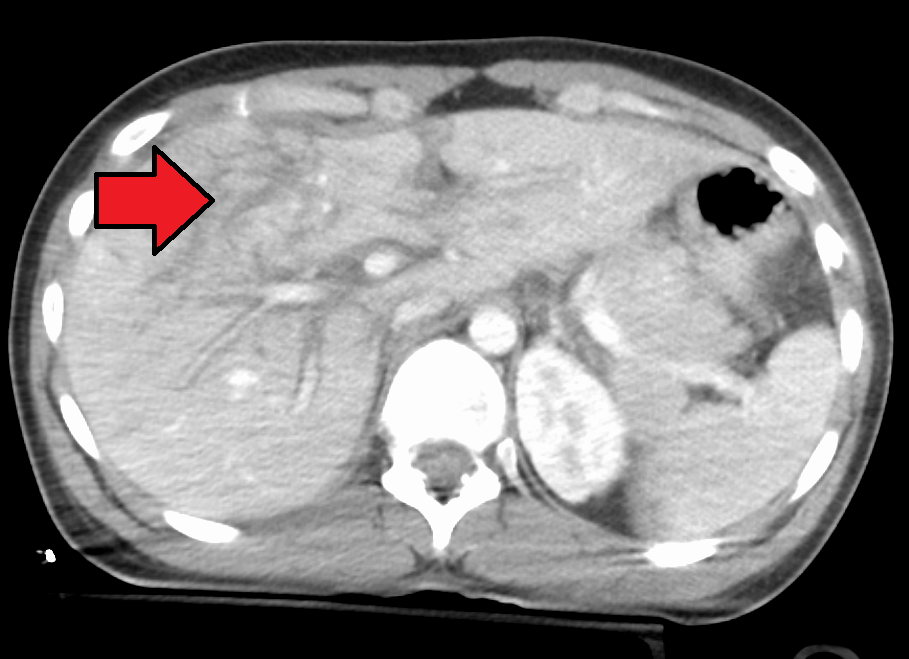
Grade 4 liver laceration

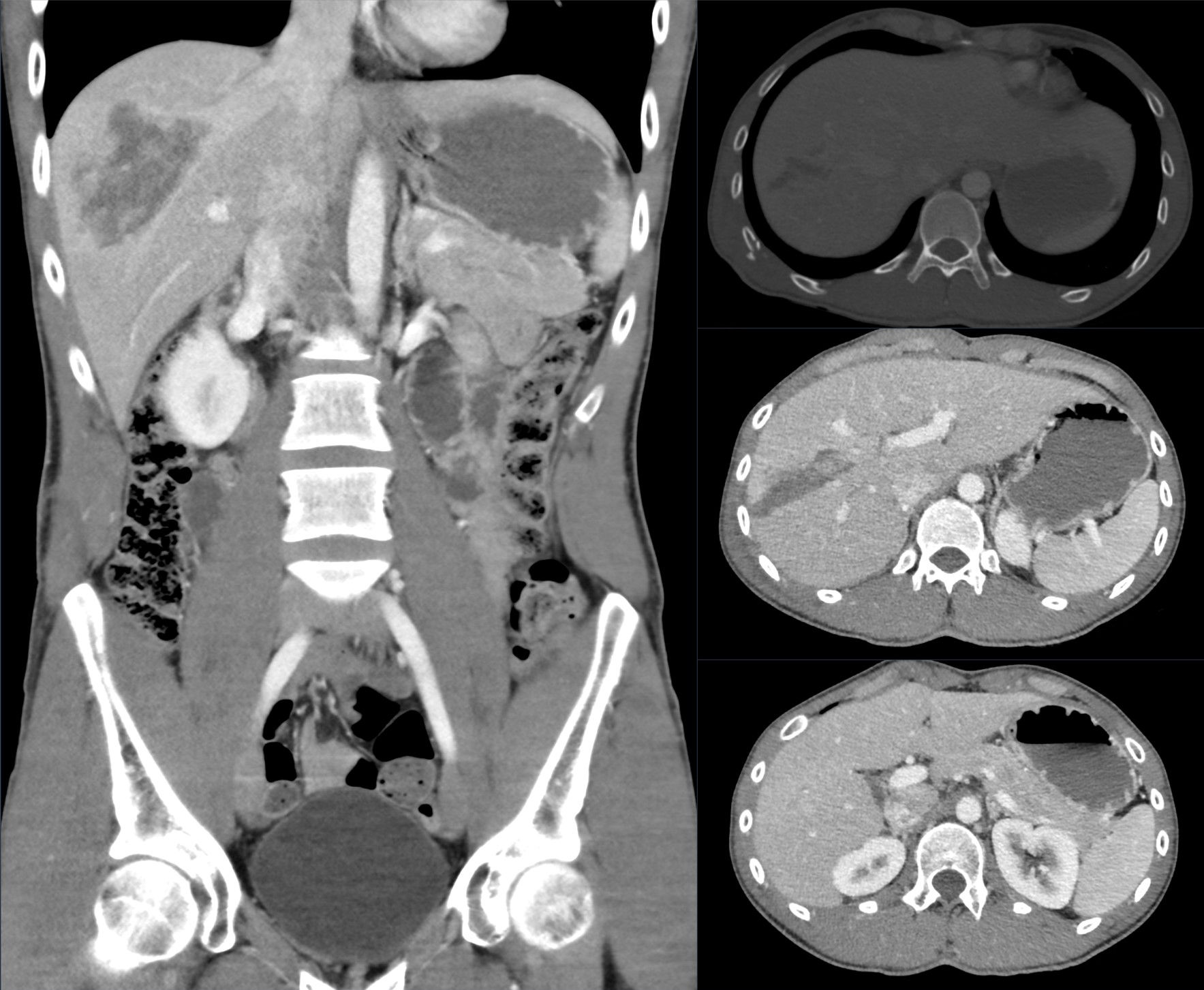

Imaging, such as the use of ultrasound or a computed tomography scan, is the generally preferred way of diagnosis as it is more accurate and is sensitive to bleeding, however; due to logistics this is not always possible. For a person who is hemodynamically unstable a focused assessment with sonography for trauma (FAST) scan may take place which is used to find free floating fluid in the right upper quadrant and left lower quadrant of the abdomen. The FAST scan however may not be indicated in those who are obese and those with subcutaneous emphysema. Its speed and sensitivity to injuries resulting in 400mL of free-floating fluid make it a valuable tool in the evaluation of unstable persons. Computed tomography is another diagnostic study which can be performed, but typically is only used in those who are hemodynamically stable. A physical examination may be used but is typically inaccurate in blunt trauma, unlike in penetrating trauma where the trajectory the projectile took can be followed digitally. The absence of external signs does not exclude internal injury; in one autopsy series of fatal blunt abdominal trauma, over a third of cases (34.6%) had internal organ injury with no external evidence of abdominal trauma. A diagnostic peritoneal lavage (DPL) may also be utilized but has limited application as it is hard to determine the origin of the bleeding. A diagnostic peritoneal lavage is generally discouraged when FAST is available as it is invasive and non-specific.

=== Classification ===
Liver injuries are classified on a Roman numeral scale with I being the least severe, to VI being the most severe, according to the AAST (American Association for the Surgery of Trauma) liver injury scale.

The Liver Injury Scale classification (2026 revision)
Grade	Color	Subcapsular hematoma	Laceration	Vascular injury
I	Blue	<10% surface area	<1 cm in depth	-
II	Green	10–50% surface area	1–3 cm	-
III	Yellow	>50% or >10 cm	>3 cm	Any injury in the presence of a liver vascular injury or active bleeding contained within liver parenchyma
IV	Orange		25–75% of a hepatic lobe	Active bleeding extending beyond the liver parenchyma into the peritoneum
V	Red		>75% of a hepatic lobe	Juxtahepatic venous injury to include retrohepatic vena cava and central major hepatic veins
VI	Brown		Hepatic avulsion	Complete tearing of the liver from its vascular supply and hepatic veins

In the case of multiple liver injuries with different grades, the overall grade should be classified by the higher grade of injury. One grade should also be added in case of multiple injuries, up to grade III.

Generally, any injury ≥III requires surgery.

Calculators have been developed that facilitate grading of liver injury based on imaging findings.

== Management ==
The initial management of liver trauma generally follows the same procedures for all traumas with a focus on maintaining airway, breathing, and circulation. A physical examination is a cornerstone of the assessment of which there are various non-invasive means of diagnostic tools that can be utilized. An invasive diagnostic peritoneal lavage can also be used to diagnose and classify the extent of the damage. A large majority of liver injuries are minor and require only observation. Generally if there is estimated to be less than 300mL of free floating fluid, no injury to surrounding organs, and no need for blood transfusion, there is a low risk of complication from nonoperative management. In special cases where there is a higher risk with surgery, such as in the elderly, nonoperative management would include the infusion of packed red blood cells in an intensive care unit. Typically hepatic injuries resulting from stab wounds cause little damage unless a vital part of the liver is injured, such as the hepatic portal vein; with gunshot wounds, the damage is worse.

=== Surgery ===
In severe liver injuries (class ≥III), or those with hemodynamic instability, surgery is generally necessary. Surgical techniques such as perihepatic packing or the use of the Pringle manoeuvre can be used to control hemorrhage. Temporary control of the hemorrhage can be accomplished through direct manual pressure to the wound site. In these severe cases it is important to prevent the progression of the trauma triad of death, which often requires the utilization of damage control surgery. New devices are being developed in order to control the bleeding using negative pressure.

The common cause of death while operating is exsanguination caused by profuse loss of blood volume. Rarely, surgery entails the use of liver resection, which removes the source of the bleeding and necrotic tissue. The drastic nature of this procedure means it can only be used in hemodynamically stable patients. Another rare procedure would be liver transplantation which is typically impractical due to the logistics of finding a proper organ donor in a timely fashion.

== Epidemiology ==
In autopsy studies of fatal blunt abdominal trauma, the liver is frequently the most commonly injured abdominal organ, although the reported proportion varies considerably between series. In a study of 185 fatal blunt abdominal trauma cases at a tertiary forensic center in Thiruvananthapuram, India (2016–2017), the liver was injured in 97 cases (52.4%), more often than the spleen (23.8%) or kidney (10.3%). Laceration was the predominant type of liver injury, seen in 79 of the 97 cases. Road traffic collisions, particularly involving motorcyclists, were the main cause of the trauma in this series. The type of liver injury was significantly associated with the presence of external abdominal injury, while no significant association was found with age or sex.

== History ==
In the 1880s a severe liver injury would in most cases prove fatal in the first 24 hours after sustaining the injury. Before the 1980s nonoperative management was seldom used in favor of the methods of management suggested by James Hogarth Pringle. During World War II the use of early laparotomy was popularized and in conjunction with the use of transfusions, advanced anesthetics, and other new surgical techniques led to decreased mortality.

== Bibliography ==
- Feliciano DV, Mattox KL, Moore EJ (2012). Trauma, Seventh Edition (Trauma (Moore)). McGraw-Hill Professional. ISBN 978-0-07-166351-9.
- Peitzman AB, Sabom M, Yearly DM, Fabian TC (2002). The trauma manual. Hagerstwon, MD: Lippincott Williams & Wilkins. ISBN 978-0-7817-2641-2.
