= Major trauma =

Injury that could cause prolonged disability or death

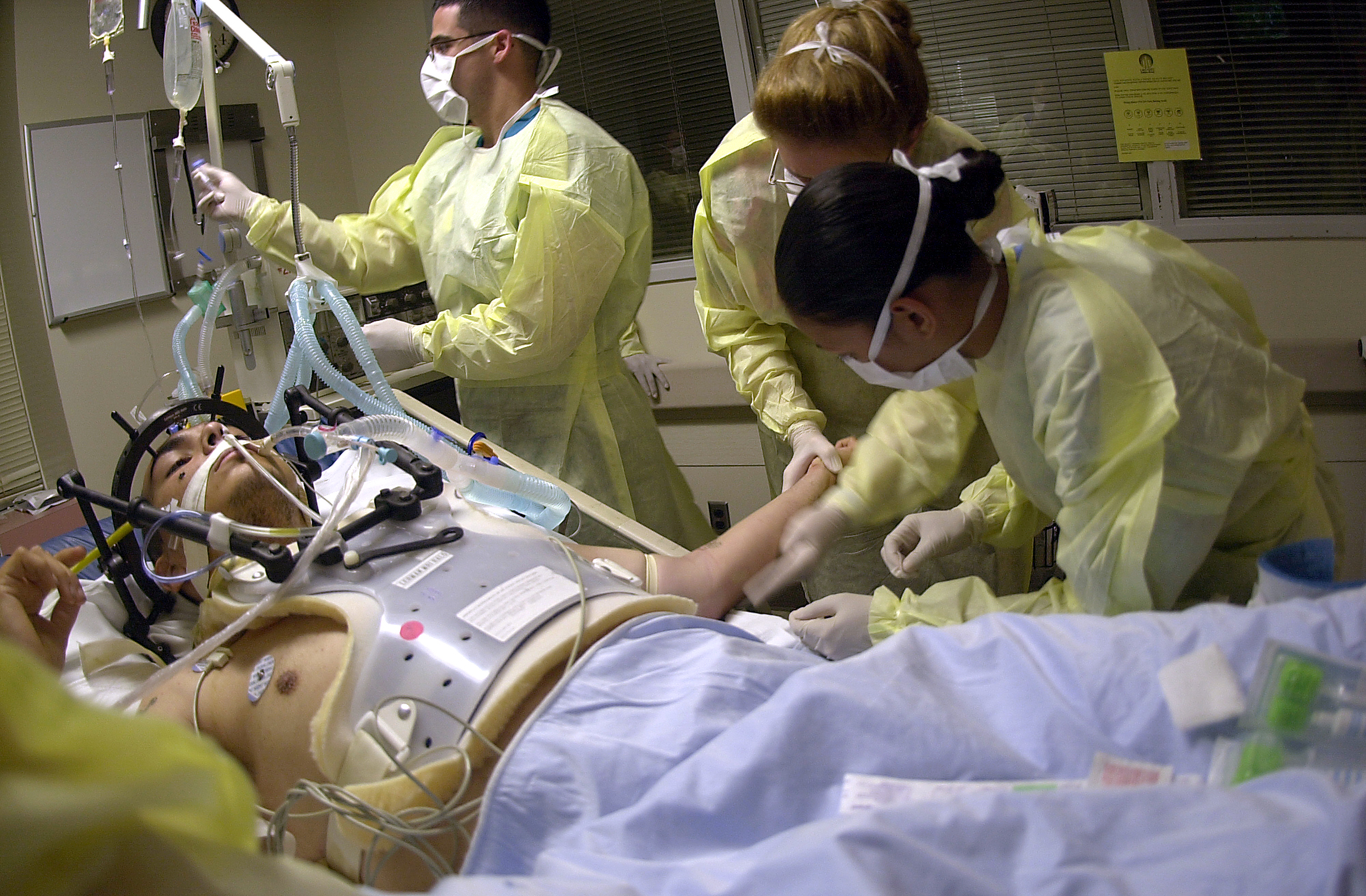
- Health care providers attending to a person on a stretcher with a gunshot wound to the head; the patient is intubated, and a mechanical ventilator is visible in the background
- Specialty: Emergency medicine, trauma surgery

Major trauma is any injury that has the potential to cause prolonged disability or death. There are many causes of major trauma, blunt and penetrating, including falls, motor vehicle collisions, stabbing wounds, and gunshot wounds. Depending on the severity of injury, quickness of management, and transportation to an appropriate medical facility (called a trauma center) may be necessary to prevent loss of life or limb. The initial assessment is critical, and involves a physical evaluation and also may include the use of imaging tools to determine the types of injuries accurately and to formulate a course of treatment.

In 2002, unintentional and intentional injuries were the fifth and seventh leading causes of deaths worldwide, accounting for 6.23% and 2.84% of all deaths. For research purposes the definition often is based on an Injury Severity Score (ISS) of greater than 15.

== Classification ==
Injuries generally are classified by either severity, the location of damage, or a combination of both. Trauma also may be classified by demographic group, such as age or gender. It also may be classified by the type of force applied to the body, such as blunt trauma or penetrating trauma. For research purposes injury may be classified using the Barell matrix, which is based on ICD-9-CM. The purpose of the matrix is for international standardization of the classification of trauma. Major trauma sometimes is classified by body area; injuries affecting 40% are polytrauma, 30% head injuries, 20% chest trauma, 10%, abdominal trauma, and 2%, extremity trauma.

Various scales exist to provide a quantifiable metric to measure the severity of injuries. The value may be used for triaging a patient or for statistical analysis. Injury scales measure damage to anatomical parts, physiological values (blood pressure etc.), comorbidities, or a combination of those. The Abbreviated Injury Scale and the Glasgow Coma Scale are used commonly to quantify injuries for the purpose of triaging and allow a system to monitor or "trend" a patient's condition in a clinical setting. The data also may be used in epidemiological investigations and for research purposes.

Approximately 2% of those who have experienced significant trauma have a spinal cord injury.

== Causes ==
Injuries may be caused by any combination of external forces that act physically against the body. The leading causes of traumatic death are blunt trauma, motor vehicle collisions, and falls, followed by penetrating trauma such as stab wounds or impaled objects. Subsets of blunt trauma are both the number one and two causes of traumatic death.

For statistical purposes, injuries are classified as either intentional such as suicide, or unintentional, such as a motor vehicle collision. Intentional injury is a common cause of traumas. Penetrating trauma is caused when a foreign body such as a bullet or a knife enters the body tissue, creating an open wound. In the United States, most deaths caused by penetrating trauma occur in urban areas and 80% of these deaths are caused by firearms. Blast injury is a complex cause of trauma because it commonly includes both blunt and penetrating trauma, and also may be accompanied by a burn injury. Trauma also may be associated with a particular activity, such as an occupational or sports injury.

== Pathophysiology ==
The body responds to traumatic injury both systemically and at the injury site. This response attempts to protect vital organs such as the liver, to allow further cell duplication and to heal the damage. The healing time of an injury depends on various factors including sex, age, and the severity of injury.

The symptoms of injury may manifest in many different ways, including:

- Altered mental status
- Fever
- Increased heart rate
- Generalized edema
- Increased cardiac output
- Increased rate of metabolism

Various organ systems respond to injury to restore homeostasis by maintaining perfusion to the heart and brain. Inflammation after injury occurs to protect against further damage and starts the healing process. Prolonged inflammation may cause multiple organ dysfunction syndrome or systemic inflammatory response syndrome. Immediately after injury, the body increases production of glucose through gluconeogenesis and its consumption of fat via lipolysis. Next, the body tries to replenish its energy stores of glucose and protein via anabolism. In this state the body will temporarily increase its maximum expenditure for the purpose of healing injured cells.

== Diagnosis ==
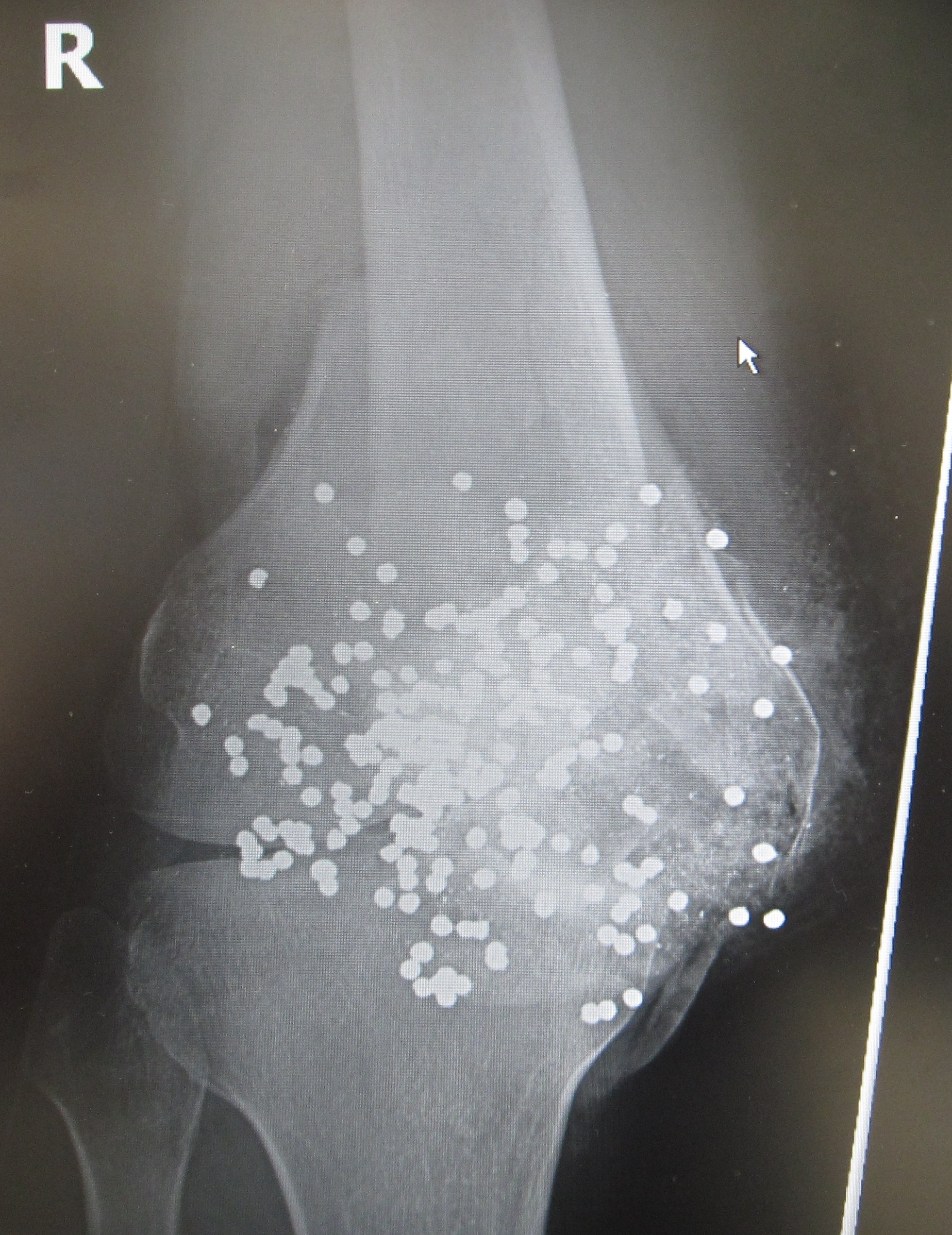
Radiograph of a close-range shotgun blast injury to the knee. Birdshot pellets are visible within and around the shattered patella, distal femur, and proximal tibia

The initial assessment is critical in determining the extent of injuries and what will be needed to manage an injury, and for treating immediate life threats.

=== Physical examination ===
Primary physical examination is undertaken to identify any life-threatening problems, after which the secondary examination is carried out. This may occur during transportation or upon arrival at the hospital. The secondary examination consists of a systematic assessment of the abdominal, pelvic, and thoracic areas, a complete inspection of the body surface to find all injuries, and a neurological examination. Injuries that may manifest themselves later may be missed during the initial assessment, such as when a patient is brought into a hospital's emergency department. Generally, the physical examination is performed in a systematic way that first checks for any immediate life threats (primary survey), and then taking a more in-depth examination (secondary survey).

=== Imaging ===
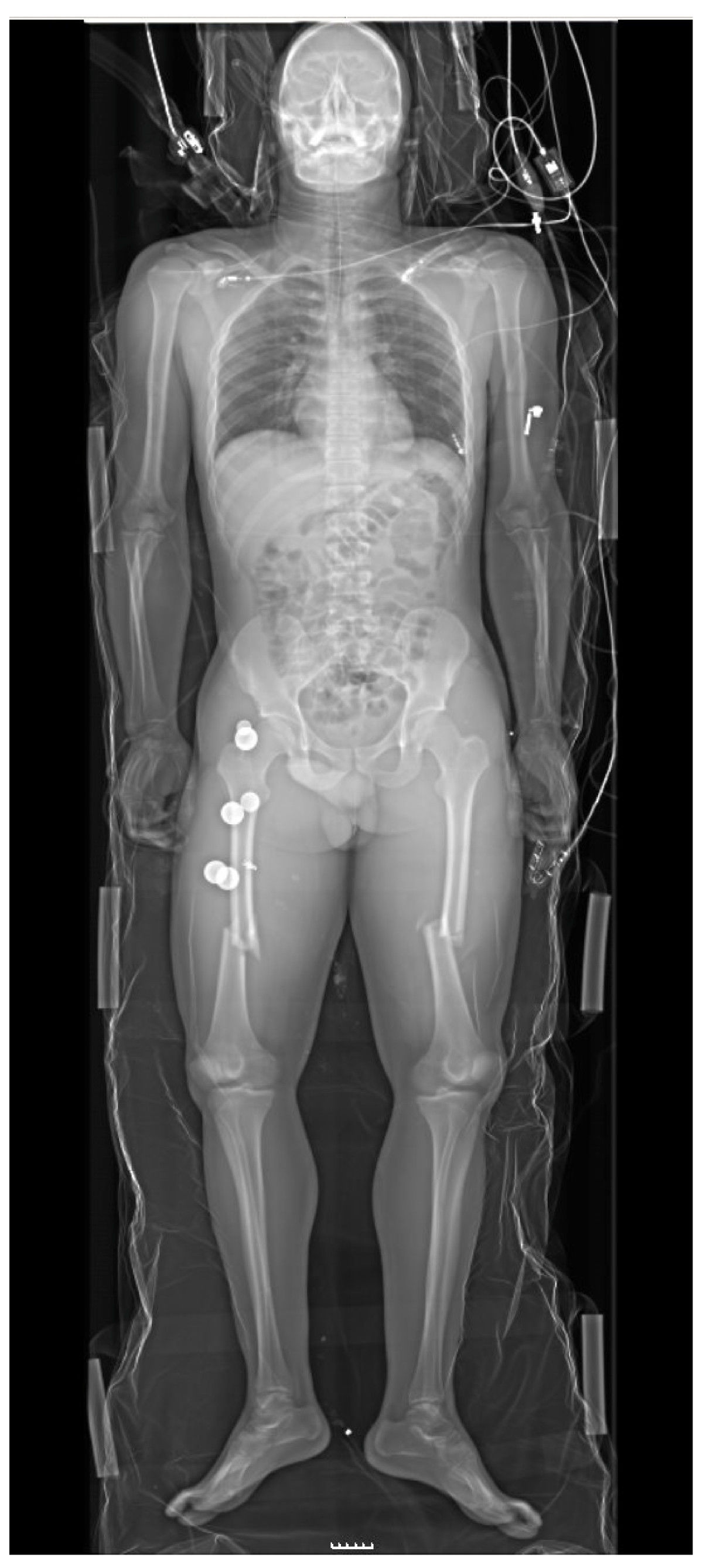
Whole body radiograph of traumatic injuries notable for fractures of both femurs (thigh bones), indicating major trauma

Persons with major trauma commonly have chest and pelvic x-rays taken, and, depending on the mechanism of injury and presentation, a focused assessment with sonography for trauma (FAST) exam to check for internal bleeding. For those with relatively stable blood pressure, heart rate, and sufficient oxygenation, CT scans are useful. Full-body CT scans, known as pan-scans, improve the survival rate of those who have suffered major trauma. These scans use intravenous injections for the radiocontrast agent, but not oral administration. There are concerns that intravenous contrast administration in trauma situations without confirming adequate renal function may cause damage to kidneys, but this does not appear to be significant.

In the U.S., CT or MRI scans are performed on 15% of those with trauma in emergency departments. Where blood pressure is low or the heart rate is increased—likely from bleeding in the abdomen—immediate surgery bypassing a CT scan is recommended. Modern 64-slice CT scans are able to rule out, with a high degree of accuracy, significant injuries to the neck following blunt trauma.

=== Surgical techniques ===
Surgical techniques, using a tube or catheter to drain fluid from the peritoneum, chest, or the pericardium around the heart, often are used in cases of severe blunt trauma to the chest or abdomen, especially when a person is experiencing early signs of shock. In those with low blood-pressure, likely because of bleeding in the abdominal cavity, cutting through the abdominal wall surgically is indicated.

== Prevention ==
By identifying risk factors present within a community and creating solutions to decrease the incidence of injury, trauma referral systems may help to enhance the overall health of a population. Injury prevention strategies are commonly used to prevent injuries in children, who are a high risk population. Injury prevention strategies generally involve educating the general public about specific risk factors and developing strategies to avoid or reduce injuries. Legislation intended to prevent injury typically involves seatbelts, child car-seats, helmets, alcohol control, and increased enforcement of the legislation. Other controllable factors, such as the use of drugs including alcohol or cocaine, increases the risk of trauma by increasing the likelihood of traffic collisions, violence, and abuse occurring. Prescription drugs such as benzodiazepines may increase the risk of trauma in elderly people.

The care of acutely injured people in a public health system requires the involvement of bystanders, community members, health care professionals, and health care systems. It encompasses pre-hospital trauma assessment and care by emergency medical services personnel, emergency department assessment, treatment, stabilization, and in-hospital care among all age groups. An established trauma system network is also an important component of community disaster preparedness, facilitating the care of people who have been involved in disasters that cause large numbers of casualties, such as earthquakes.

== Management ==
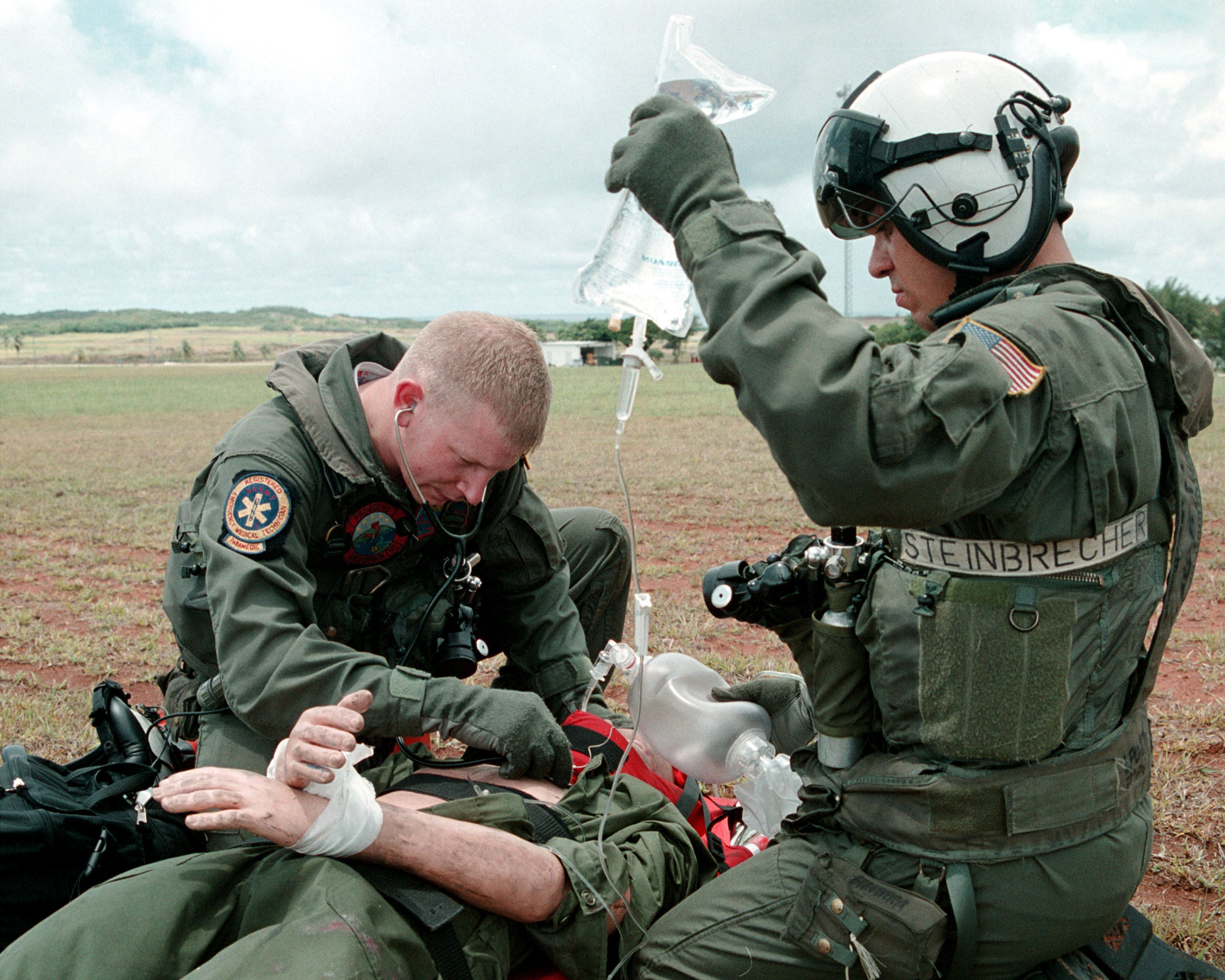
A Navy corpsman listens for the correct tube placement on an intubated trauma victim during a search and rescue exercise

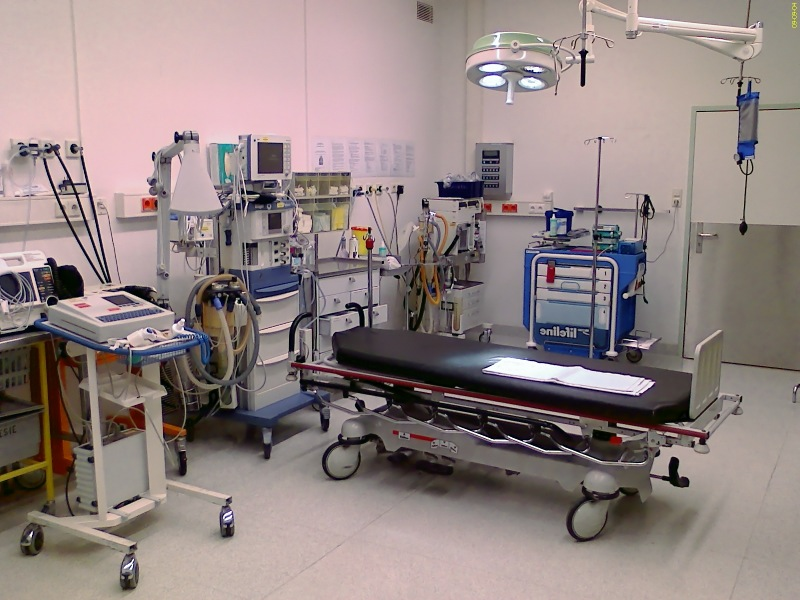
Typical trauma room

=== Pre-hospital ===
The pre-hospital use of stabilization techniques improves the chances of a person surviving the journey to the nearest trauma-equipped hospital. Emergency medicine services determines which people need treatment at a trauma center as well as provide primary stabilization by checking and treating airway, breathing, and circulation as well as assessing for disability and gaining exposure to check for other injuries.

Spinal motion restriction by securing the neck with a cervical collar and placing the person on a long spine board was of high importance in the pre-hospital setting, but due to lack of evidence to support its use, the practice is losing favor. Instead, it is recommended that more exclusive criteria be met such as age and neurological deficits to indicate the need of these adjuncts. This may be accomplished with other medical transport devices, such as a Kendrick extrication device, before moving the person. It is important to quickly control severe bleeding with direct pressure to the wound and consider the use of hemostatic agents or tourniquets if the bleeding continues. Conditions such as impending airway obstruction, enlargening neck hematoma, or unconsciousness require intubation. It is unclear, however, if this is best performed before reaching hospital or in the hospital.

Rapid transportation of severely injured patients improves the outcome in trauma. Helicopter EMS transport reduces mortality compared to ground-based transport in adult trauma patients. Before arrival at the hospital, the availability of advanced life support does not greatly improve the outcome for major trauma when compared to the administration of basic life support. Evidence is inconclusive in determining support for pre-hospital intravenous fluid resuscitation while some evidence has found it may be harmful. Hospitals with designated trauma centers have improved outcomes when compared to hospitals without them, and outcomes may improve when persons who have experienced trauma are transferred directly to a trauma center.

Improvements in pre-hospital care have led to "unexpected survivors", where patients survive trauma when they would have previously been expected to die. However these patients may struggle to rehabilitate.

=== In-hospital ===
Management of those with trauma often requires the help of many healthcare specialists including physicians, nurses, respiratory therapists, and social workers. Cooperation allows many actions to be completed at once. Generally, the first step of managing trauma is to perform a primary survey that evaluates a person's airway, breathing, circulation, and neurologic status. These steps may happen simultaneously or depend on the most pressing concern such as a tension pneumothorax or major arterial bleed. The primary survey generally includes assessment of the cervical spine, though clearing it is often not possible until after imaging, or the person has improved. After immediate life threats are controlled, a person is either moved into an operating room for immediate surgical correction of the injuries, or a secondary survey is performed that is a more detailed head-to-toe assessment of the person.

Indications for intubation include airway obstruction, inability to protect the airway, and respiratory failure. Examples of these indications include penetrating neck trauma, expanding neck hematoma, and being unconscious. In general, the method of intubation used is rapid sequence intubation followed by ventilation, though intubating in shock due to bleeding can lead to arrest, and should be done after some resuscitation whenever possible. Trauma resuscitation includes control of active bleeding. When a person is first brought in, vital signs are checked, an ECG is performed, and, if needed, vascular access is obtained. Other tests should be performed to get a baseline measurement of their current blood chemistry, such as an arterial blood gas or thromboelastography. In those with cardiac arrest due to trauma chest compressions are considered futile, but still recommended. Correcting the underlying cause such as a pneumothorax or pericardial tamponade, if present, may help.

A FAST exam may help assess for internal bleeding. In certain traumas, such as maxillofacial trauma, it may be beneficial to have a highly trained health care provider available to maintain airway, breathing, and circulation.

=== Intravenous fluids ===
Traditionally, high-volume intravenous fluids were given to people who had poor perfusion due to trauma. This is still appropriate in cases with isolated extremity trauma, thermal trauma, or head injuries. In general, however, giving lots of fluids appears to increase the risk of death. Current evidence supports limiting the use of fluids for penetrating thorax and abdominal injuries, allowing mild hypotension to persist. Targets include a mean arterial pressure of 60 mmHg, a systolic blood pressure of 70–90 mmHg, or the re-establishment of peripheral pulses and adequate ability to think. Hypertonic saline has been studied and found to be of little difference from normal saline.

As no intravenous fluids used for initial resuscitation have been shown to be superior, warmed Lactated Ringer's solution continues to be the solution of choice. If blood products are needed, a greater use of fresh frozen plasma and platelets instead of only packed red blood cells has been found to improve survival and lower overall blood product use; a ratio of 1:1:1 is recommended. The success of platelets has been attributed to the fact that they may prevent coagulopathy from developing. Cell salvage and autotransfusion also may be used.

Blood substitutes such as hemoglobin-based oxygen carriers are in development; however, as of 2013 there are none available for commercial use in North America or Europe. These products are only available for general use in South Africa and Russia.

=== Medications ===
Tranexamic acid decreases death in people who are having ongoing bleeding due to trauma, as well as those with mild to moderate traumatic brain injury and evidence of intracranial bleeding on CT scan. It only appears to be beneficial, however, if administered within the first three hours after trauma. For severe bleeding, for example from bleeding disorders, recombinant factor VIIa—a protein that assists blood clotting—may be appropriate. While it decreases blood use, it does not appear to decrease the mortality rate. In those without previous factor VII deficiency, its use is not recommended outside of trial situations.

Other medications may be used in conjunction with other procedures to stabilize a person who has sustained a significant injury. While positive inotropic medications such as norepinephrine sometimes are used in hemorrhagic shock as a result of trauma, there is a lack of evidence for their use. Therefore, as of 2012 they have not been recommended. Allowing a low blood pressure may be preferred in some situations.

=== Surgery ===
The decision whether to perform surgery is determined by the extent of the damage and the anatomical location of the injury. Bleeding must be controlled before definitive repair may occur. Damage control surgery is used to manage severe trauma in which there is a cycle of metabolic acidosis, hypothermia, and hypotension that may lead to death, if not corrected. The main principle of the procedure involves performing the fewest procedures to save life and limb; less critical procedures are left until the victim is more stable. Approximately 15% of all people with trauma have abdominal injuries, and approximately 25% of these require exploratory surgery. The majority of preventable deaths from trauma result from unrecognised intra-abdominal bleeding.

== Prognosis ==
Trauma deaths occur in immediate, early, or late stages. Immediate deaths usually are due to apnea, severe brain or high spinal cord injury, or rupture of the heart or of large blood vessels. Early deaths occur within minutes to hours and often are due to hemorrhages in the outer meningeal layer of the brain, torn arteries, blood around the lungs, air around the lungs, ruptured spleen, liver laceration, or pelvic fracture. Immediate access to care may be crucial to prevent death in persons experiencing major trauma. Late deaths occur days or weeks after the injury and often are related to infection. Prognosis is better in countries with a dedicated trauma system where injured persons are provided quick and effective access to proper treatment facilities.

Long-term prognosis frequently is complicated by pain; more than half of trauma patients have moderate to severe pain one year after injury. Many also experience a reduced quality of life years after an injury, with 20% of victims sustaining some form of disability. Physical trauma may lead to development of post-traumatic stress disorder (PTSD). One study has found no correlation between the severity of trauma and the development of PTSD.

== Epidemiology ==
Deaths from injuries per 100,000 inhabitants in 2004: no data < 25 25–50 50–75 75–100 100–125 125–150 / 150–175 175–200 200–225 225–250 250–275 > 275

Incidence of accidents by activity in Denmark

Trauma is the sixth leading cause of death worldwide, resulting in five million or 10% of all deaths annually. It is the fifth leading cause of significant disability. About half of trauma deaths are in people aged between 15 and 45 years and trauma is the leading cause of death in this age group. Injury affects more males; 68% of injuries occur in males and death from trauma is twice as common in males as it is in females, this is believed to be because males are much more willing to engage in risk-taking activities. Teenagers and young adults are more likely to need hospitalization from injuries than other age groups. While elderly persons are less likely to be injured, they are more likely to die from injuries sustained due to various physiological differences that make it more difficult for the body to compensate for the injuries. The primary causes of traumatic death are central nervous system injuries and substantial blood loss. Various classification scales exist for use with trauma to determine the severity of injuries, which are used to determine the resources used and, for statistical collection.

== History ==
The human remains discovered at the site of Nataruk in Turkana, Kenya, are claimed to show major trauma—both blunt and penetrating—caused by violent trauma to the head, neck, ribs, knees, and hands, which has been interpreted by some researchers as establishing the existence of warfare between two groups of hunter-gatherers 10,000 years ago. The evidence for blunt-force trauma at Nataruk has been challenged, however, and the interpretation that the site represents an early example of warfare has been questioned.

== Society and culture ==
=== Economics ===
The financial cost of trauma includes both the amount of money spent on treatment and the loss of potential economic gain through absence from work. The average financial cost for the treatment of traumatic injury in the United States is approximately US$334,000 per person, making it costlier than the treatment of cancer and cardiovascular diseases. One reason for the high cost of the treatment for trauma is the increased possibility of complications, which leads to the need for more interventions. Maintaining a trauma center is costly because they are open continuously and maintain a state of readiness to receive patients, even if there are none. In addition to the direct costs of the treatment, there also is a burden on the economy due to lost wages and productivity, which in 2009, accounted for approximately US$693.5 billion in the United States.

=== Low- and middle-income countries ===
Citizens of low- and middle-income countries (LMICs) often have higher mortality rates from injury. These countries accounted for 89% of all deaths from injury worldwide. Many of these countries do not have access to sufficient surgical care and many do not have a trauma system in place. In addition, most LMICs do not have a pre-hospital care system that treats injured persons initially and transports them to hospital quickly, resulting in most casualty patients being transported by private vehicles. Also, their hospitals lack the appropriate equipment, organizational resources, or trained staff. By 2020, the amount of trauma-related deaths is expected to decline in high-income countries, while in low- to middle-income countries it is expected to increase.

== Special populations ==
=== Children ===
Cause	Deaths per year
Traffic collision	260,000
Drowning	175,000
Burns	96,000
Falls	47,000
Toxins	45,000

Due to anatomical and physiological differences, injuries in children need to be approached differently from those in adults. Accidents are the leading cause of death in children between 1 and 14 years old. In the United States, approximately sixteen million children go to an emergency department due to some form of injury every year, with boys being more frequently injured than girls by a ratio of 2:1. The world's five most common unintentional injuries in children as of 2008 are road crashes, drowning, burns, falls, and poisoning.

Weight estimation is an important part of managing trauma in children because the accurate dosing of medicine may be critical for resuscitative efforts. A number of methods to estimate weight, including the Broselow tape, Leffler formula, and Theron formula exist.

=== Pregnancy ===
Trauma occurs in approximately 5% of all pregnancies, and is the leading cause of maternal death. Additionally, pregnant women may experience placental abruption, pre-term labor, and uterine rupture. There are diagnostic issues during pregnancy; ionizing radiation has been shown to cause birth defects, although the doses used for typical exams generally are considered safe. Due to normal physiological changes that occur during pregnancy, shock may be more difficult to diagnose. Where the woman is more than 23 weeks pregnant, it is recommended that the fetus be monitored for at least four hours by cardiotocography.

A number of treatments beyond typical trauma care may be needed when the patient is pregnant. Because the weight of the uterus on the inferior vena cava may decrease blood return to the heart, it may be very beneficial to lay a woman in late pregnancy on her left side. also recommended are Rho(D) immune globulin in those who are rh negative, corticosteroids in those who are 24 to 34 weeks and may need delivery or a caesarean section in the event of cardiac arrest.

== Research ==
Most research on trauma occurs during war and military conflicts as militaries will increase trauma research spending in order to prevent combat related deaths. Some research is being conducted on patients who were admitted into an intensive care unit or trauma center, and received a trauma diagnosis that caused a negative change in their health-related quality of life, with a potential to create anxiety and symptoms of depression. New preserved blood products also are being researched for use in pre-hospital care; it is impractical to use the currently available blood products in a timely fashion in remote, rural settings or in theaters of war.

== Bibliography ==
- Jeff Garner; Greaves, Ian; Ryan, James R.; Porter, Keith R. (2009). Trauma Care Manual. London, England: Hodder Arnold. ISBN 978-0-340-92826-4.
- Feliciano, David V.; Mattox, Kenneth L.; Moore, Ernest J (2012). Trauma, Seventh Edition (Trauma (Moore)). McGraw-Hill Professional. ISBN 978-0-07-166351-9.
- Andrew B., Peitzman; Michael, MD Sabom; Donald M., MD Yearly; Timothy C., MD Fabian (2002). The trauma manual. Hagerstwon, MD: Lippincott Williams & Wilkins. ISBN 978-0-7817-2641-2.
