= Early appropriate care =

Early appropriate care (EAC) is a system in orthopaedic trauma surgery aiming to identify serious major trauma patients and treat the most time-critical injuries without adding to their physiological burden.

== Measures ==
EAC prescribes that definitive management of unstable axial skeleton and long bone fractures should only be undertaken within 36 hours if an adequate response to resuscitation has been demonstrated by:

- pH ≥7.25
- Lactate ≤4 mmol/L
- Base excess > (less negative than) -5.5 mmol/L

Other factors such as coagulopathy and hypothermia (parts of the Trauma triad of death) would also be indications for DCO with external fixation.

== History ==
Early total care (ETC) became widespread in the 1980s, when studies showed early definitive fixation of long bone fractures lead to better outcomes, with a reduction in incidence of secondary ARDS, fat embolism and sepsis. Subsequent studies showed that in the unstable patient, long operations lead to a 'second hit' which actually worsened mortality outcomes.

A philosophy of damage control orthopaedics (DCO) was proposed in 2000, aiming to prevent early death in a critically wounded patient via stabilization and not definitive fixation, often with the use of external fixation systems.

EAC was developed by Heather Vallier while at MetroHealth in Cleveland. The term early appropriate care was first proposed in her Journal of Orthopaedic Trauma article in 2013 as an evolution of DCO, with a focus on resuscitation rather than injury severity score.

== See also ==
- Damage control surgery
