= Splenorenal recess =

Anatomic space

The splenorenal recess (perisplenic space, pouch of Koller, or Koller's pouch) is the intraperitoneal compartment that separates the spleen and the left kidney. It is located in the left posterior axillary line at the level of the 10th and 11th ribs.

As a potential space, the recess is not normally filled with fluid. However, intra-abdominal fluid (e.g. blood or pus) can accumulate here in circumstances where the abdomen fills with fluid, such as hemoperitoneum or splenic laceration. This fluid may be detected via ultrasound sonography when the patient is lying on their back, similar to the hepatorenal recess (Morison's pouch), which is located on the right side between the right kidney and liver. Like Morison's pouch, Koller's pouch is part of the Focused Assessment with Sonography for Trauma (FAST) exam in emergency medicine.

== Clinical importance ==
Since it is a potential space, the splenorenal recess is not normally filled with fluid. However, this space becomes significant in conditions in which fluid collects within the abdomen (most commonly ascites, hemoperitoneum, and splenic laceration or blunt trauma). Importantly, the spleen is the most frequently injured internal organ after blunt trauma, accounting for up to 49% of abdominal organ injuries. The intraperitoneal fluid, be it blood, ascites, or dialysate, collects in this space and may be visualized, most commonly via ultrasound or computed tomography (CT) scanning. As little as 30 or 40 ml of fluid in the abdominal cavity may be visualised in this space.

Early visualization of fluid in the splenorenal recess on FAST scan may be an indication for urgent laparotomy.

== Etymology ==
The splenorenal recess is also called Koller's pouch or the pouch of Koller, and is named after the German surgeon H. J. Koller.
