= Hepatorenal recess =

Area between liver and right kidney

Details

Identifiers
- Latin: recessus hepatorenalis, recessus subhepatici
- TA98: A10.1.02.427
- TA2: 3721
- FMA: 14715

The hepatorenal recess (right subhepatic space, pouch of Morison or Morison's pouch) is the subhepatic space that separates the liver from the right kidney. It is the lowest dependent space of the peritoneal cavity in a supine person. As a potential space, the recess is not normally filled with fluid. However, fluid can collect here in circumstances where the abdomen fills with fluid, such as hemoperitoneum. This fluid may be seen on ultrasound or computed tomography (CT scan).

== Clinical importance ==
Since it is a potential space, the hepatorenal recess is not normally filled with fluid. However, this space becomes significant in conditions in which fluid collects within the abdomen (most commonly ascites and hemoperitoneum). The intraperitoneal fluid, be it blood, ascites, or dialysate, collects in this space and may be visualized, most commonly via ultrasound or computed tomography (CT) scanning. As little as 30 or 40 ml of fluid in the abdominal cavity may be visualized in this space.

Early visualization of fluid in the hepatorenal recess on FAST scan may be an indication for urgent laparotomy.

== Etymology ==
The hepatorenal recess is also called the pouch of Morison, or Morison's pouch, after the British surgeon James Rutherford Morison.

== Additional images ==
A normal ultrasonographic view of Morison's pouch. The bright line is the capsule of the kidney; there is no fluid present and hence no visible space.

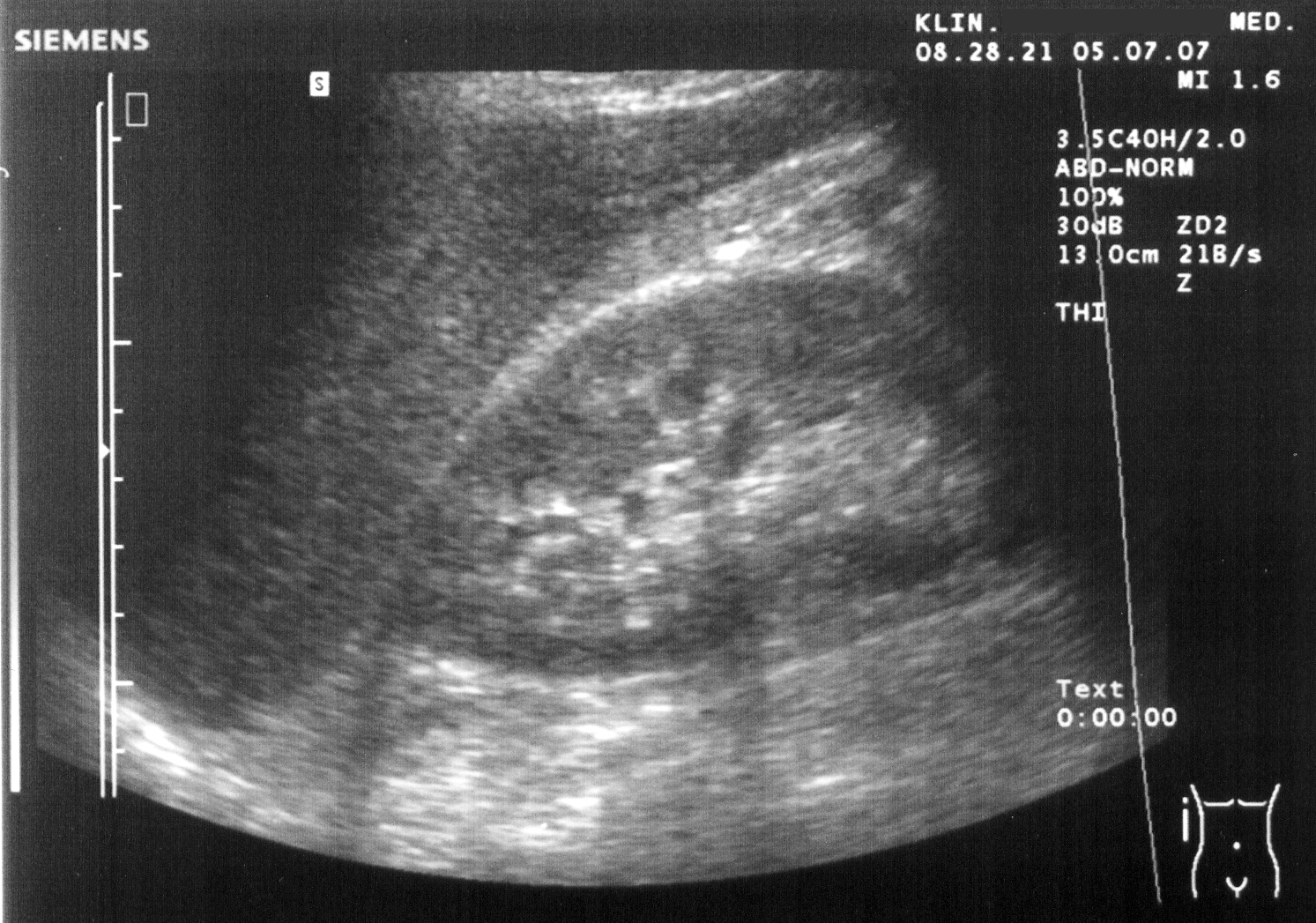
Ultrasound of liver (left side of the image) and right kidney (right side of the image) and Morison's pouch, not containing fluid

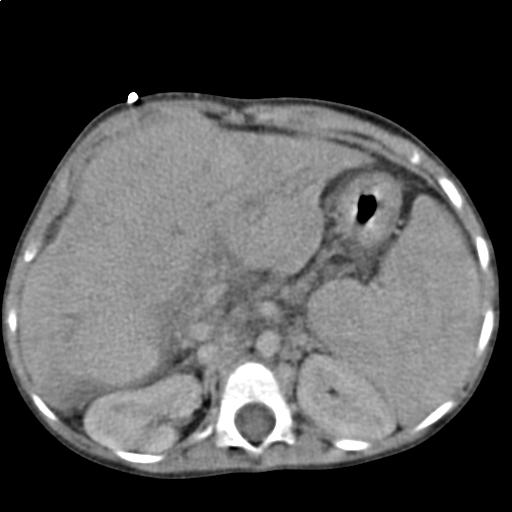
Abdominal CT, showing Morison's pouch as the dark margin surrounding the right kidney (at lower left corner of image)

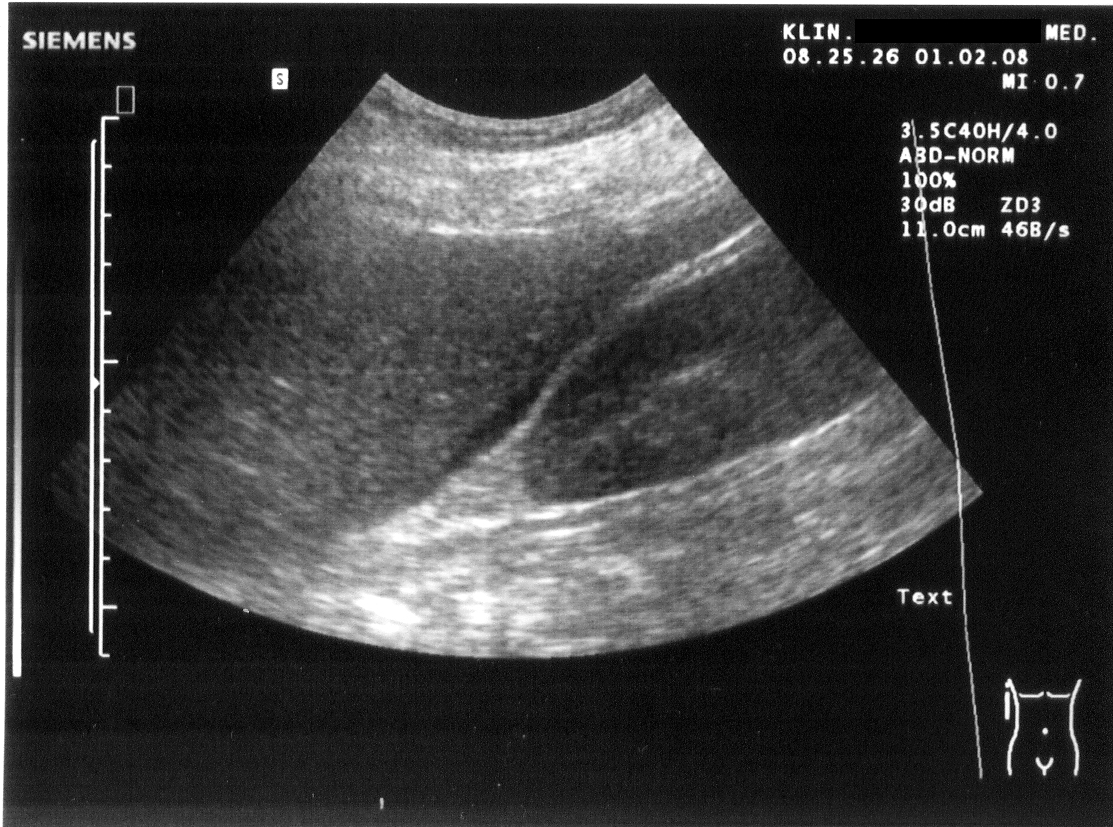
Ultrasonographic view of the abdomen demonstrating fluid within Morison's pouch

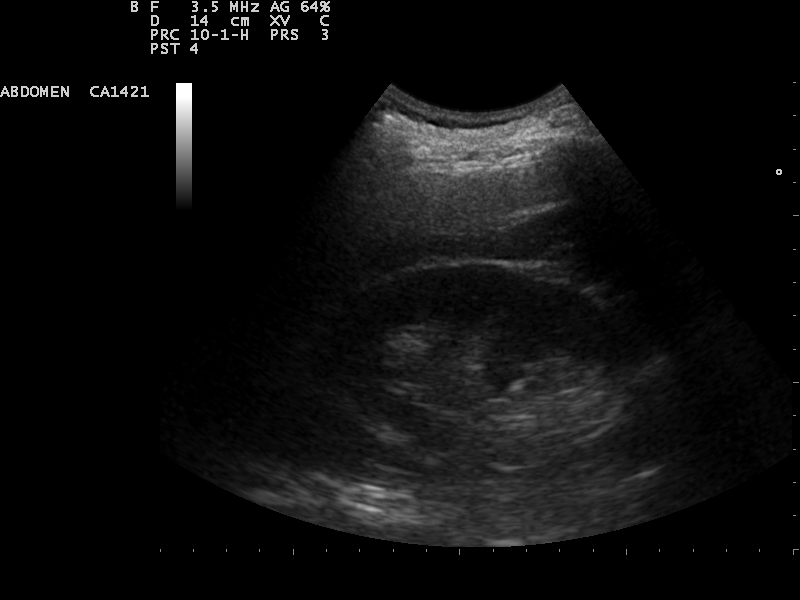

== See also ==
- Koller's pouch
- Cul-de-sac of Douglas
