= Perihepatic packing =

Surgical procedure

- Specialty: Trauma surgery

Perihepatic packing is a surgical procedure used in connection with trauma surgery to the liver. In this procedure the liver is packed to stop non arterial bleeding, most often caused by liver injury.

During this surgery laparotomy pads are placed around the bleeding liver. The main purpose of hepatic packing is to prevent the bleeding so trauma triad of death can be avoided. Under- or over-packing of the liver can cause adverse outcomes, and if the bleeding cannot be controlled through this surgical method, the Pringle manoeuvre is an alternate technique that can be utilized temporally.
