= Stab wound =

Form of penetrating trauma

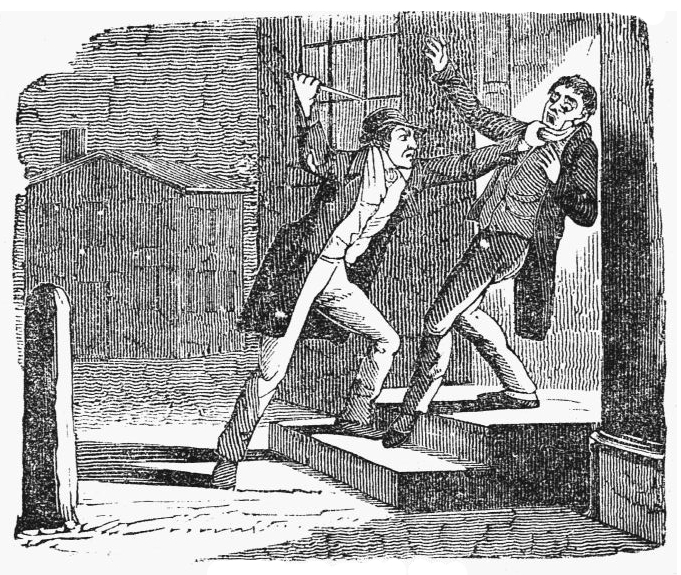
- An 1833 depiction of Jereboam O. Beauchamp stabbing Solomon P. Sharp.
- Specialty: Emergency medicine, Trauma surgery

A stab wound is a specific form of penetrating trauma to the skin that results from a knife, sword, or a similar pointed object. While stab wounds are typically known to be caused by knives, they can also occur from a variety of implements, including broken bottles and ice picks. Most stabbings occur because of intentional violence or through self-infliction. The treatment is dependent on many different variables such as the anatomical location and the severity of the injury. Even though stab wounds are inflicted at a much greater rate than gunshot wounds, they account for less than 10% of all penetrating trauma deaths.

== Management ==
Stab wounds can result in various internal and external injuries. These wounds are typically caused by low-velocity weapons, meaning the damage is usually confined to the weapon's path, unlike gunshot wounds which often affect surrounding tissues. The abdomen is the most commonly injured area in cases of stab wounds. Interventions that may be needed depending on severity of the injury include airway, intravenous access, and control of hemorrhage. The length and size of the knife blade, as well as its trajectory, are critical factors in assessing and predicting which internal structures may have been damaged. There are also special considerations to take into effect as given the nature of injuries, there is a higher likelihood that persons with these injuries might be under the influence of drugs which can make it harder to obtain a complete medical history. Special precautions should also be taken to prevent further injury from a perpetrator to the victim in a hospital setting. Similarly to treating shock, it is important to keep the systolic pressure above 90mmHg, maintain the person's core body temperature, and for prompt transport to a trauma center in severe cases.

To determine if internal bleeding is present a focused assessment with sonography (FAST) or diagnostic peritoneal lavage (DPL) can be used. Other diagnostic tests such as a computed tomography scan or various contrast studies can be used to more definitively classify the injury in both severity and location. Local wound exploration is also another technique that may be utilized to determine how far the object penetrated. Observation can be used in place of surgery as it can substitute an unnecessary surgery, which makes it the preferred treatment of penetrating trauma secondary to a stab wound when hypovolemia or shock is not present. Laboratory diagnostic studies such as a hematocrit, white blood cell count and chemical tests such as liver function tests can also help to determine the efficiency of care.

=== Surgery ===
Surgical intervention may be required, but it depends on what organ systems are affected by the wound and the extent of the damage. It is important for care providers to thoroughly check the wound site in as much as a laceration of an artery often results in delayed complications sometimes leading to death. In cases where there is no suspicion of bleeding or infection, there is no known benefit of surgery to correct any present injuries. Typically a surgeon will track the path of the weapon to determine the anatomical structures that were damaged and repair any damage they deem necessary. Surgical packing of the wounds is generally not the favored technique to control bleeding as it can be less useful than fixing the directly affected organs. In severe cases when homeostasis cannot be maintained the use of damage control surgery may be utilized.

== Epidemiology ==
Hilt mark left from a knife

Stab wounds are one of the most common forms of penetrating trauma globally, but account for a lower mortality compared to blunt injuries due to their more focused impact on a person. Stab wounds can result from self-infliction, accidental nail gun injuries, and stingray injuries, however, most stab wounds are caused by intentional violence, as the weapons used to inflict such wounds are readily available compared to guns. Stabbings are a relatively common cause of homicide in Canada and the United States. Typically death from stab wounds is due to organ failure or blood loss. They are the mechanism of approximately 2% of suicides.

In Canada, homicides by stabbing and gunshot occur relatively equally (1,008 to 980 for the years 2005 to 2009). In the United States guns are a more common method of homicide (9,484 versus 1,897 for stabbing or cutting in 2008).

Stab wounds occur four times more than gunshot wounds in the United Kingdom, but the mortality rate associated with stabbing has ranged from 0–4% as 85% of injuries sustained from stab wounds only affect subcutaneous tissue. In Belgium, most assaults resulting in a stab wound occur to and by men and persons of ethnic minorities.

Sharp Instrument Homicides by Selected Countries
Country	Sharp Instrument Homicides	Rate per 100,000 people	% Of Homicides Where Sharp Instrument Is Used	Year of Incidents
Canada	201	0.59	37%	2011
United States of America	1589	0.51	11%	2012
Scotland	26	0.49	58%	2012/13
New Zealand	15	0.32	26%	2016
Australia	94	0.43		2009
England & Wales	193	0.34	39%	2012
South Sudan	15	0.14	1%	2012
Egypt	514	0.65	19%	2011
South Africa	6840	13.8	37%	2007
Bahamas	22	5.9	17%	2011
Dominican Republic	567	5.53	25%	2012
Grenada	10	9.44	71%	2012
Jamaica	215	7.81	19%	2011
Saint Vincent and the Grenadines	11	10.08	44%	2010
Trinidad and Tobago	56	4.22	16%	2011
Belize	41	12.94	33%	2011
Costa Rica	77	1.62	19%	2012
El Salvador	545	8.65	21%	2012
Honduras	717	9.04	10%	2011
Nicaragua	377	6.48	48%	2010
Panama	111	2.92	17%	2012
Chile	204	1.18	32%	2011
Colombia	2054	4.31	14%	2011
Guyana	59	7.38	45%	2011
Uruguay	68	2.01	34%	2011
China	3487	0.26	26%	2010
Mongolia	93	3.4	35%	2011
Armenia	14	0.47	26%	2011
Azerbaijan	33	0.36	17%	2010
Cyprus	6	0.52	26%	2012
Bulgaria	49	0.67	35%	2012
Czech Republic	40	0.38	47%	2011
Hungary	48	0.47	36%	2012
Finland	31	0.56	35%	2012
Iceland	1	0.30	100%	2012
Albania	30	0.95	19%	2011
Andorra	1	1.3	100%	2010
Bosnia and Herzegovina	4	0.10	8%	2010
Croatia	19	0.44	37%	2012
Italy	159	0.27	27%	2009
Malta	3	0.70	25%	2012
Montenegro	2	0.38	14%	2011
Serbia	19	0.20	17%	2012
Slovenia	6	0.30	43%	2012
Spain	142	0.31	39%	2012
Macedonia	2	0.10	7%	2011
Austria	27	0.30	39%	2011
Luxembourg	2	0.40	50%	2011
Switzerland	13	0.17	28%	2011

== History ==
Some of the first principles of wound care come from Hippocrates who promoted keeping wounds dry except for irrigation. Guy de Chauliac would promote removal of foreign bodies, rejoining of severed tissues, maintenance of tissue continuity, preservation of organ substance, and prevention of complications. The first successful operation on a person who was stabbed in the heart was performed in 1896 by Ludwig Rehn, in what is now considered the first case of heart surgery. In the late 1800s it was hard to treat stab wounds because of poor transportation of victims to health facilities and the low ability for surgeons to effectively repair organs. However, the use of laparotomy, which has been developed a few years earlier, had provided better patient outcomes than had been seen before. After its inception, the use of exploratory laparotomies was highly encouraged for "all deep stab wounds" in which surgeons were to stop active bleeding, repair damage, and remove "devitalized tissues". Because laparotomies were seen to benefit patients, they were used on most every person with an abdominal stab wound until the 1960s when doctors were encouraged to use them more selectivity in favor of observation. During the Korean War, a greater emphasis was put on the use of pressure dressings and tourniquets to initially control bleeding.

== See also ==
- Gunshot wound

== Bibliography ==
- Feliciano, David V.; Mattox, Kenneth L.; Moore, Ernest J (2012). Trauma, Seventh Edition (Trauma (Moore)). McGraw-Hill Professional. ISBN 978-0-07-166351-9.
- Marx, John A. Marx (2014). Rosen's emergency medicine: concepts and clinical practice (8th ed.). Philadelphia, PA: Elsevier/Saunders. pp. Chapter. ISBN 978-1-4557-0605-1.
