= Heather Vallier =

Heather Audrey Vallier
- Known for: Early appropriate care Orthopaedic trauma resuscitation guidelines First female OTA president
- Scientific career
- Fields: Orthopaedic surgery
- Workplaces: MetroHealth; Cleveland Clinic

Heather A. Vallier is an American orthopaedic surgeon at Cleveland Clinic and was the 36th president of the Orthopaedic Trauma Association and the first ever female president. She is known for developing early appropriate care, the resuscitation criteria now used globally to determine when polytraumatized patients are optimized for orthopaedic trauma surgical intervention.

== Education ==
She completed undergraduate studies at Northwestern University in 1989. She later graduated from Stanford University School of Medicine.

Vallier subsequently completed an orthopaedic surgery residency at the University of Wisconsin. She later followed by a fellowship in orthopaedic traumatology at Harborview Medical Center in Seattle, Washington.

== Career ==
Vallier worked at MetroHealth Medical Center in Cleveland as the Clyde L. Nash, MD Jr. Professor of Orthopaedic Education, prior to being recruited to the Cleveland Clinic in 2024.

== Research ==
=== Early Appropriate Care ===
Vallier developed the concept of Early Appropriate Care, which re-defined Orthopaedic trauma resuscitation guidelines globally by determining when delayed definitive fixation for pelvis, femur, acetabulum, and spine fractures was indicated, and when polytraumatized patients were physiologically optimized for surgery.

=== Other research ===
In a highly cited article published in The Journal of Bone and Joint Surgery (JBJS), Vallier demonstrated the time operative intervention for talar neck fractures does not impact the subsequent development of osteonecrosis. Instead, her findings showed the degree of displacement is what impacts osteonecrosis rates, impacting the management of talar neck fractures.

She has acted as the Steering Committee member of the Multicenter Extremity Trauma Research Consortium (METRC) since 2010 at MetroHealth, a network of 22 core level I civilian trauma centers and 4 core military treatment centers. This collaboration resulted in the PREVENT CLOT trial, demonstrating thromboprophylaxis with aspirin was noninferior to low-molecular-weight heparin for patients with extremity fractures, published in The New England Journal of Medicine in 2023. She was an investigator in the "Study to prospectively evaluate reamed intramedullary nails in tibial shaft fractures" (SPRINT) trial, which demonstrated reamed intramedullary tibial nails are superior to unreamed nails for closed fractures, but no different for open fractures.

Vallier's research has been funded by the US Department of Defense and NIH (National Institute of Arthritis and Musculoskeletal and Skin Diseases). Vallier has a H-index of 42.

== Honors and awards ==
Vallier was elected as the president of the Orthopaedic Trauma Association in 2021, the largest organization dedicated to orthopaedic trauma globally, recognizing her contributions to the field of orthopaedic trauma.
