= James Rutherford Morison =

British surgeon

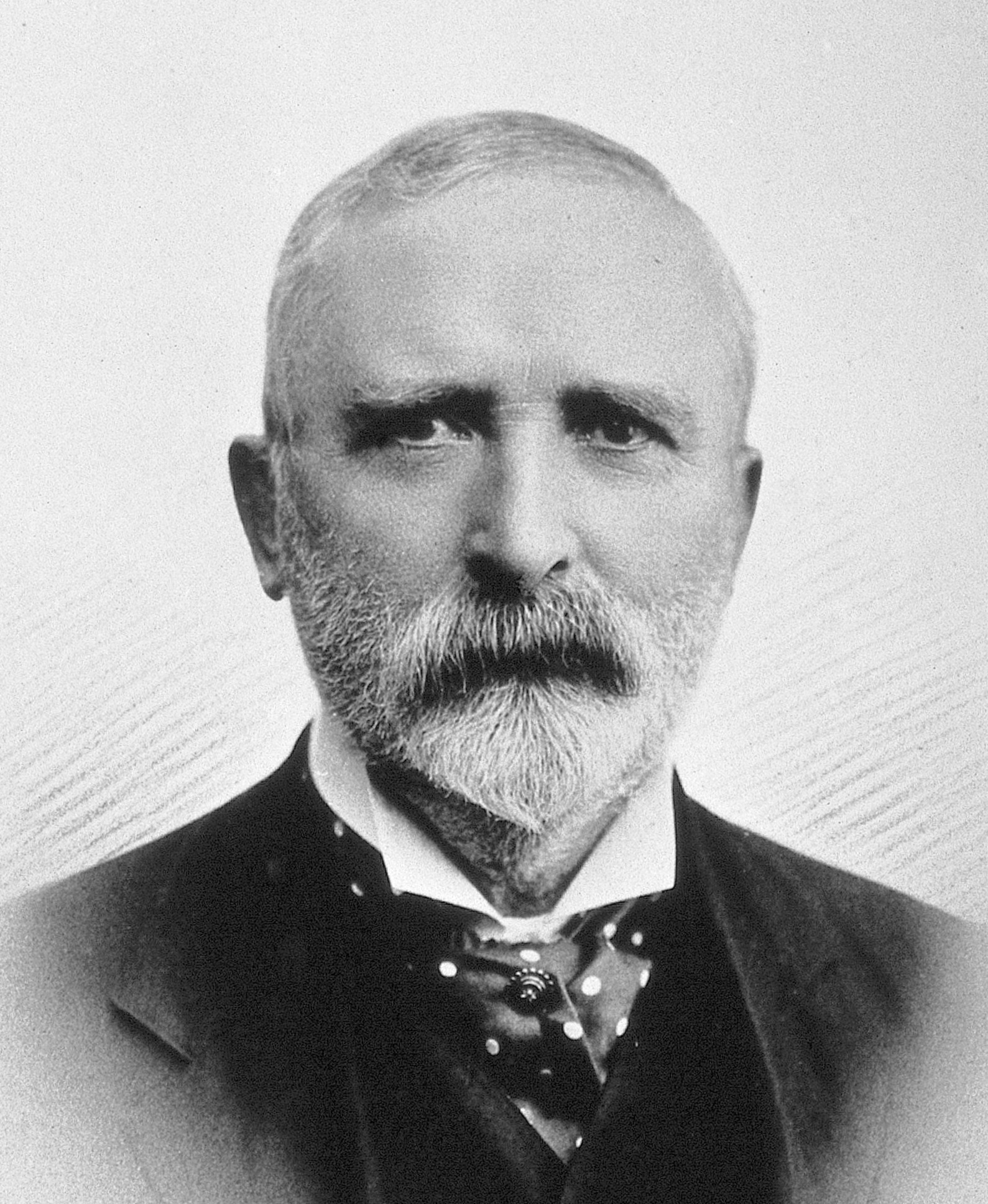
James Rutherford Morison

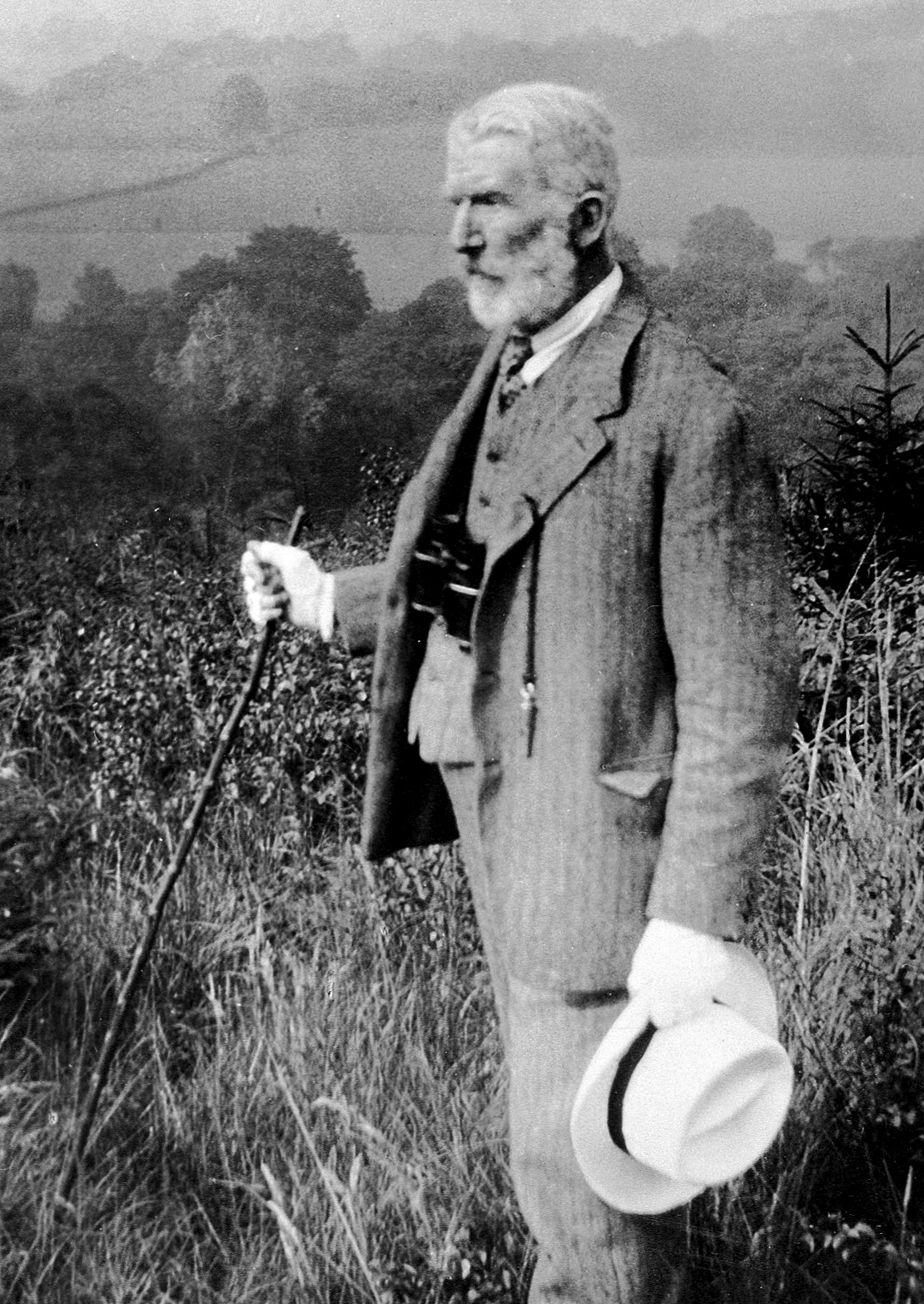
James Rutherford Morison

James Rutherford Morison (10 October 1853, Hutton Henry County Durham, England – 9 January 1939, Newcastle upon Tyne, England) was a British surgeon.

In 1874, he graduated from the University of Edinburgh, and as a young man was an assistant and "surgical dresser" to Joseph Lister (1827–1912). Later, he became a surgeon at the Newcastle Royal Infirmary and a professor at the University of Durham. He was considered by his students to be an excellent teacher. In 1893 he was elected a member of the Harveian Society of Edinburgh.

He is remembered for the eponymous "Morison's pouch", also known as the hepatorenal recess, being described as an anatomical space between the under surface of the liver and the right kidney. His name is also associated with a surgical incision for access to sigmoid colon and pelvis, particularly used if the midline is very scarred from previous surgery (Rutherford Morison incision), and a medical instrument (Rutherford Morison tissue forceps).

During World War I, he was stationed at the Northumberland War Hospital, where he introduced a paste for treatment of contaminated wounds. This substance was to become known as "BIPP", an acronym for bismuth iodoform paraffin paste.
