= George Hogarth Pringle =

Scottish-Australian surgeon

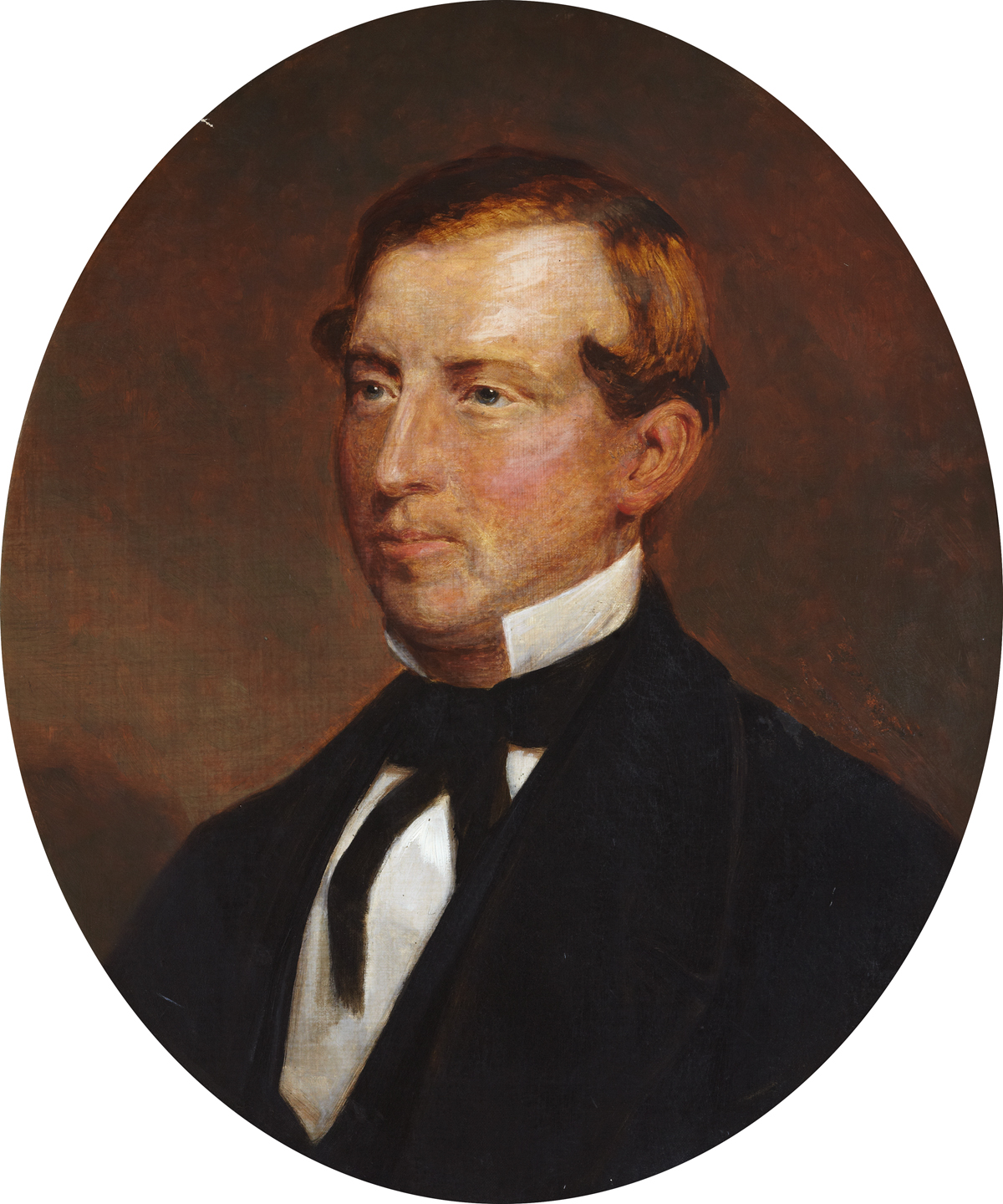
- Born: 22 December 1830
- Died: 31 March 1872 (aged 41)
- Education: University of Edinburgh
- Known for: Introducing Listerian antisepsis into Australia
- Medical career
- Profession: Surgeon

George Hogarth Pringle (22 December 1830 – 31 March 1872) was a Scottish-Australian surgeon. He qualified in medicine from Edinburgh, Scotland and then worked in the Royal Infirmary of Edinburgh along with the young Joseph Lister with whom he continued to correspond. He settled in Parramatta, New South Wales, Australia and is credited with introducing Listerian antisepsis into Australia.

== Early life ==
George Hogarth Pringle was born at Kintail in Ross-shire, Scotland to Mary Hogarth (1803–1850) and James Hall Pringle (1801–1873) a tenant farmer at Hyndlee, near Hawick in Scottish Borders, a farm described in Walter Scott's novel Guy Mannering. It has been suggested his mother was related to William Hogarth (1697–1764) the artist and to Charles Dickens (1812–1870). Examination of the relevant birth and death certificates does not reveal any obvious relationship to either.

Little is known about his early years or schooling. Pringle qualified Licentiate of the Royal College of Surgeons from the Royal College of Surgeons of Edinburgh in 1852 and MD from the University of Edinburgh the same year with a thesis entitled Organic Stricture of the Urethra.

He was appointed House Surgeon in the Royal Infirmary of Edinburgh under Professor James Syme (1799–1870) and Professor James Spence (1812–1882). One of his fellow residents in the Infirmary was Joseph Lister (1827–1912) with whom he maintained a lifelong correspondence. George Hogarth Pringle left Edinburgh to serve as a Medical Officer in the Crimean War as a surgeon on a ship transporting the sick and wounded from the battlefields of the Crimean Peninsula to the base hospital at Scutari.

Thereafter, he worked as a ship's surgeon with the Cunard Company and then on the Peninsular and Oriental Steam Navigation Company Company's Clydebuilt ship SS Emeu between Suez and Sydney.

== Emigration to Australia ==
In 1859, he settled in Parramatta in New South Wales and registered as a doctor there (number 500) that year. Parramatta, now part of greater Sydney and situated at the head of the navigable part of the Parramatta river, was proclaimed a city in 1788, the year of the arrival of the first fleet. It was here that the Governor's residence was established in 1799.

Pringle set up practice in George Street, Parramatta, succeeding a Dr Bassett. His partner, a fellow Scot Dr (later Sir) Normand MacLaurin (1835–1914), went on to become Chancellor of Sydney University. Pringle worked with Dr Walter Brown (b. 1821), the first of three generations of Drs Brown to practise in Parramatta. The last of the three, Dr Keith McArthur Brown, (d. 1962) wrote an account of medical practice in Parramatta which includes descriptions of Pringle's work.

He was also visiting surgeon to the Benevolent Asylum and surgeon to the King's School and Newington College, a Wesleyan School sited at that time at Silverwater.

== Introduction of antiseptic surgery to Australia ==
George Hogarth Pringle wrote a letter to the Sydney Morning Herald published on 30 January 1868. This was on ‘the treatment of compound fractures with carbolic acid by my old friend and hospital colleague Joseph Lister”, and was essentially a case report describing Pringle’s successful use of antiseptic principles for a compound fracture. He went on "Having at present under my care, what I may call a representative case of this form of treatment, the first, so far as I am aware in which it has been applied in the colony, I crave, in default of any local medical journal ..." This assertion that there was no local medical journal was not entirely correct as the Australian Medical Journal had been founded in 1856 but he may not have regarded this as ‘local’ as it was published in Melbourne. His later case reports were published in the Australian Medical Journal.

== Pringle's case report ==
He describes the treatment of a wound of the forearm sustained by the accidental discharge of a shotgun into an area some three inches above the left wrist joint: "I recommended immediate amputation" he wrote "more especially having the dread of secondary haemorrhage and lockjaw before my eyes; but neither the patient nor his relatives would consent to this, and begged for me to try to save the limb. I therefore, duly warning them of the manifold risks, resolved to try Professor Lister's plan". After wound excision, he dressed the wound with a dressing soaked in carbolic, immobilising the fracture with a fenestrated splint. He went on "Suffice to say that in dressing the arm this morning, the 34th day from receipt of the injury, I find that the whole wound has completely healed up, thus converting a compound into a simple fracture. No pus whatever has appeared ... firm union has taken place between the ends of the ulna and satisfactory progress made with the radius, perfect motion and sensibility retained in the hand". He concluded "Such are the astounding results of this method of treatment in the first case to which I have applied it. And be it remembered, this is no quack remedy, but the result of patient scientific enquiry and thought on the part of that ‘philosophical investigator’ Joseph Lister".

== The outcome ==
Pringle’s decision to publicise this case in a newspaper was criticised in subsequent correspondence to the Sydney Morning Herald. The Australian surgeon Thomas B. Hugh considered that Pringle's use of surgical and anatomical terminology suggests the article was directed at a medical readership and that Pringle’s communication to the newspaper resulted in the eventual adoption of antiseptic principles by Australian doctors.

== Death ==
Pringle had visited Britain in 1870 and during this visit qualified as a Fellow of the Royal College of Surgeons of Edinburgh (FRCSEd). He died, probably from dysentery, on board the sailing ship Parramatta on 31 March 1872 aged 41 while returning to Australia from a further visit to Britain and was buried at sea. His son James Hogarth Pringle (1863–1941) returned to Britain after his father's death. He too became a surgeon and made a number of significant contributions to surgery.
