= Peritoneal washing =

Surgical diagnostic procedure

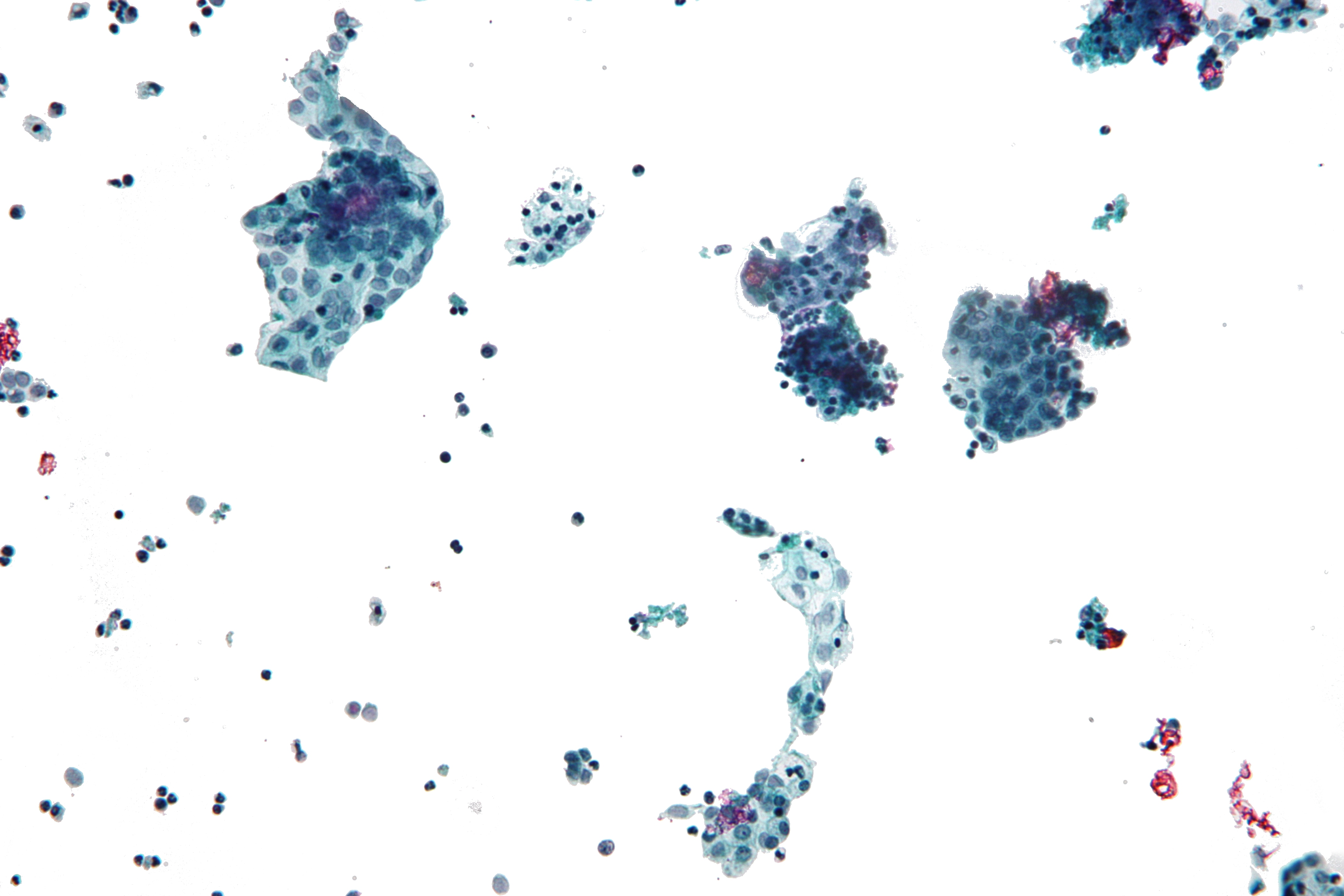
Micrograph of peritoneal washing (benign mesothelial cells)

Peritoneal washing is a procedure used to look for malignant cells, i.e. cancer, in the peritoneum.

Peritoneal washes are routinely done to stage abdominal and pelvic tumours, e.g. ovarian cancer.

== See also ==
- Peritoneal lavage

== Additional images ==
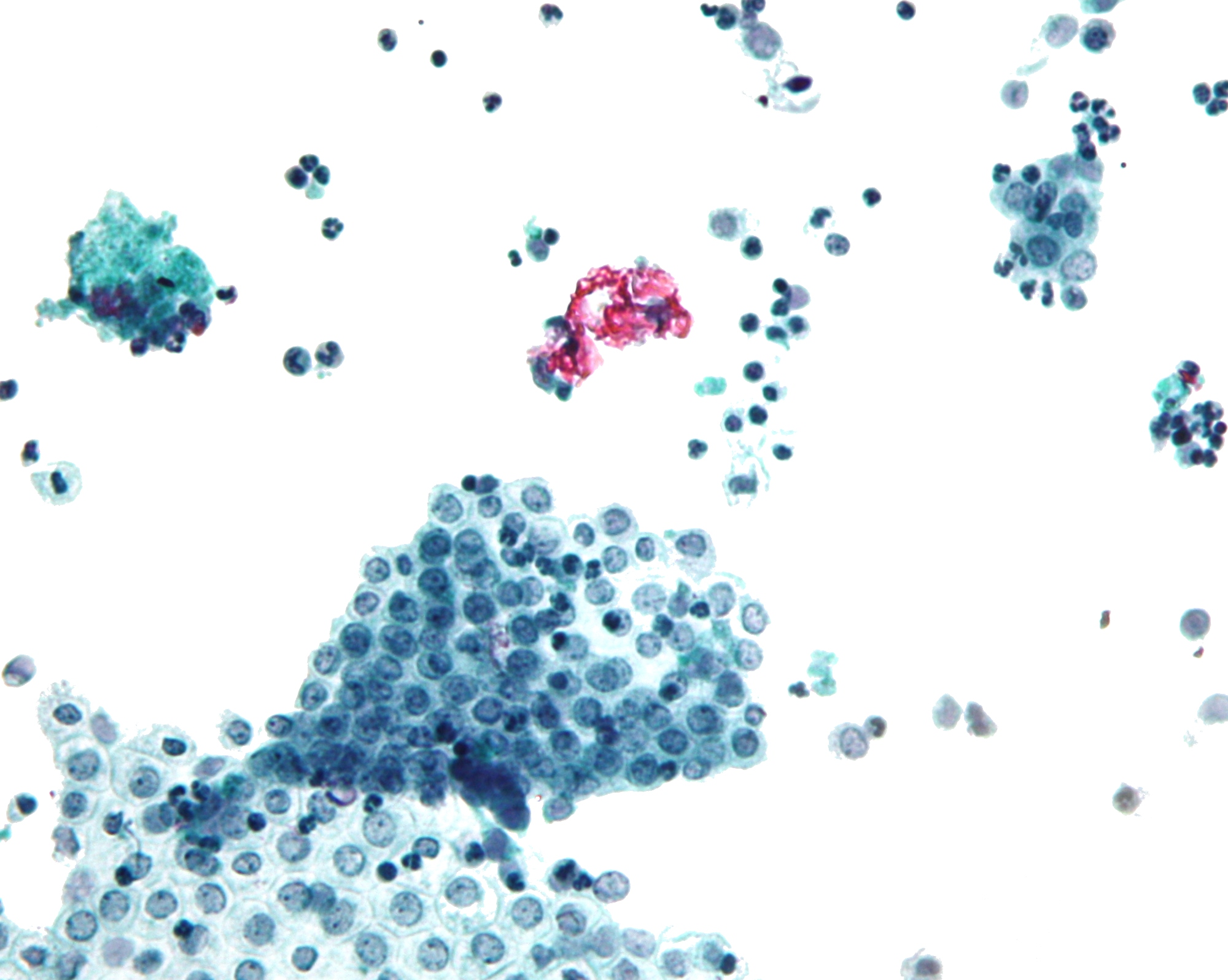
Benign mesothelium

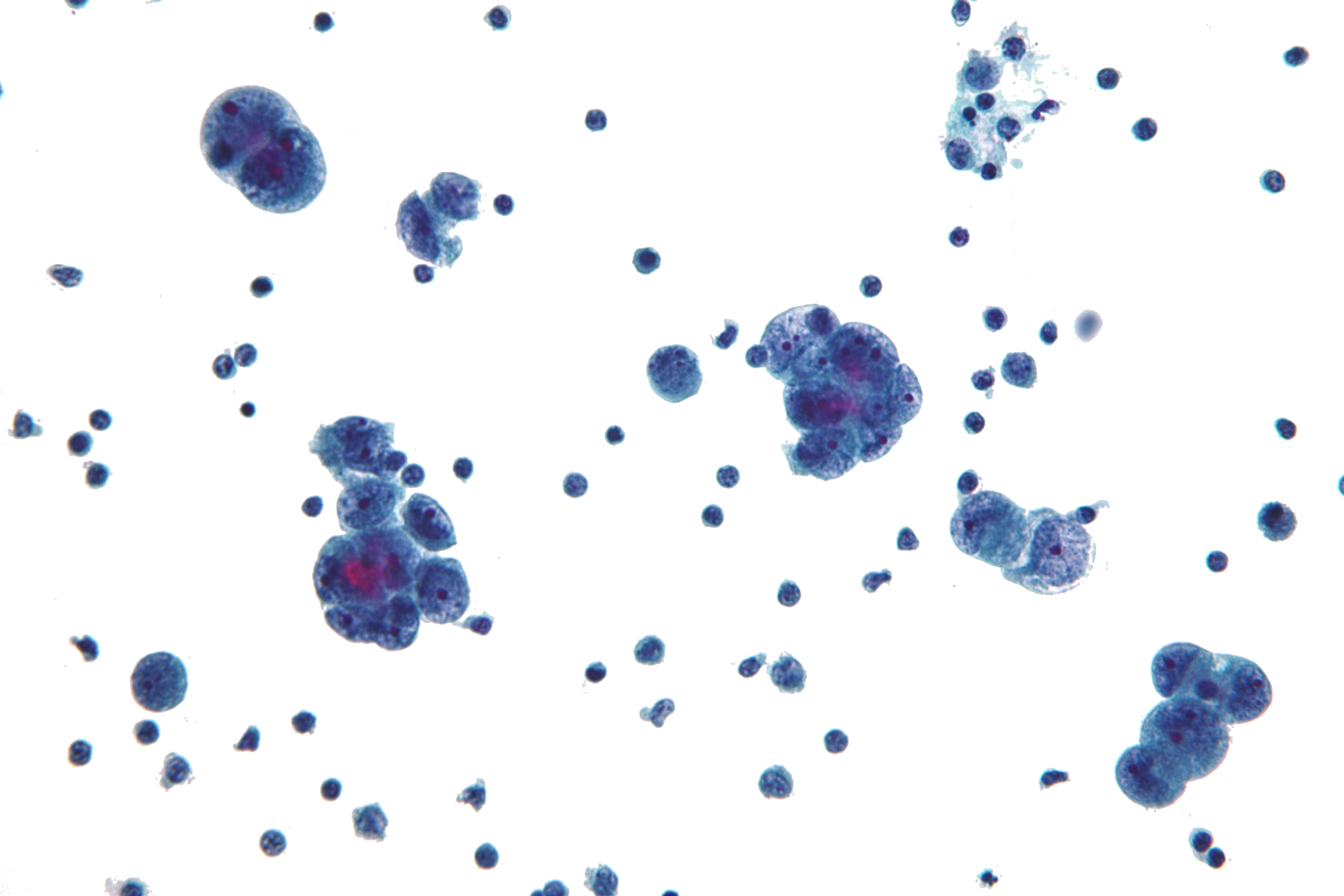
Serous carcinoma
