= James Hogarth Pringle =

Australian-British surgeon (1863–1941)

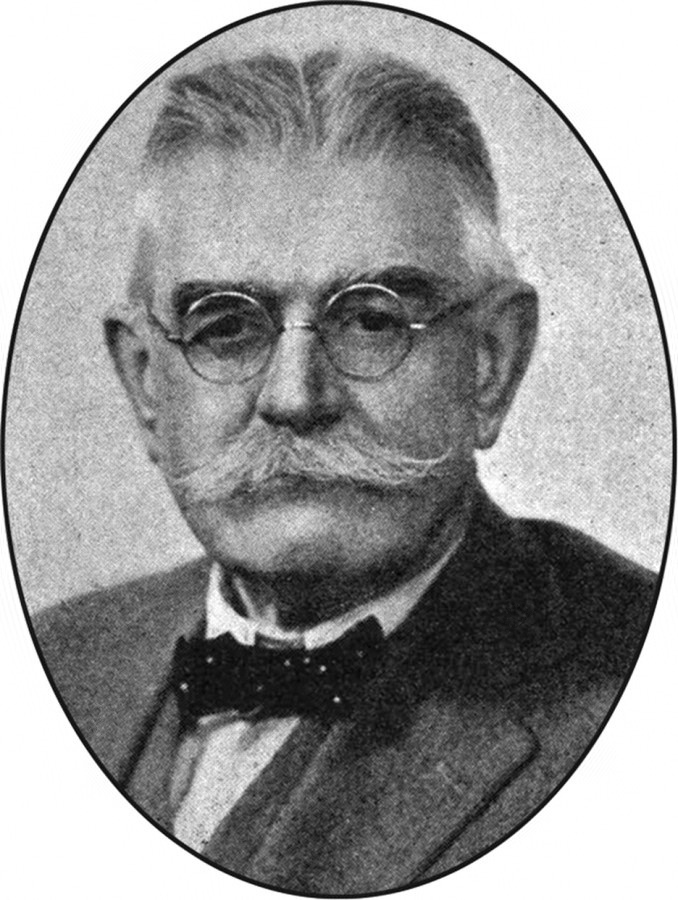

James Hogarth Pringle (born 26 January 1863 in Parramatta, Australia – died 24 April 1941 in Killearn, Scotland) was an Australian-born British surgeon in Glasgow, who made a number of important contributions to surgical practice. He is most famous for the development of the Pringle manoeuvre, a technique still used in surgery today.

== Early life ==
He was the only son of George Hogarth Pringle (1830–1871) a well known surgeon in Parramatta, New South Wales, Australia. Before emigrating to Australia George Hogarth Pringle had worked in Edinburgh with Joseph Lister and had been responsible for the introduction of antiseptic surgical practice into Australia. After his father died in 1872, James returned to Britain to school at Sedbergh School in Cumbria and from there entered the University of Edinburgh Medical School to study medicine, graduating in 1885.

After graduation he was able travel to Europe to study surgical practice at Hamburg, Berlin and Vienna. This visit to European centres was to prove important because he maintained links particularly with German, Austrian and Swiss surgeons, keeping up to date with their literature. He had training in ophthalmology at Moorfields Eye Hospital in London before becoming house surgeon under Professor Thomas Annandale (1838–1907) in Edinburgh Royal Infirmary, and then house surgeon under Sir William Macewen (1848–1924) in Glasgow Royal Infirmary. In 1892, he became a fellow of the Royal College of Surgeons of England (FRCSEng) and was appointed Surgeon to Glasgow Royal Infirmary in 1896. He became a Fellow of the Faculty of Physicians and Surgeons of Glasgow in 1899.

== Supporter of women in medicine ==
Pringle and Sir William Macewen were among the few senior figures in medicine at that time who were sympathetic to women in medicine, readily accepting women students into their clinics. Some of these were to become well known figures in later life including Louise McIlroy (1874–1968), Elsie Inglis (1864–1917), and Helen Wingate (1895–1985). In 1899, Pringle was appointed Lecturer in Surgery and Demonstrator in Anatomy to Queen Margaret College which had been established for women students and opened in 1868 and began to teach women medical students in 1890–91.

== Fracture treatment ==
Pringle made a particular study of the treatment of fractures, where he was at an advantage because X-rays had been introduced very early into clinical practice in Glasgow Royal Infirmary, an innovation that allowed Pringle to gain wide personal experience of fractures and their management. His colleague John Macintyre (1857–1928) had established the world's first x-ray service for patients in Glasgow Royal Infirmary in March 1896. This allowed James Hogarth Pringle an early, perhaps unique experience in fracture diagnosis and management using x-rays, and formed the basis for his book on fractures and their treatment. He had the added advantage of working in the hospital where Joseph Lister had first introduced antisepsis and would surely have been aware of his own father's work on antisepsis in introducing Listerian antisepsis into Australia. He was, like Sir William Macewen, an early exponent of aseptic technique in surgery. Both of these factors undoubtedly contributed to his expertise and success with fracture management.

He was a pioneer of treating fractures by fixation and had impressive results with an amputation rate for sepsis of only 2.6%, a dramatic reduction on the norm for the time. “There are few cases," he wrote, " which afford a better test of aseptic methods." But it was his policy of fixation of long fractures in an age when treatment by traction was the norm that marked him out as a pioneer. "... In every case," he wrote, "I have employed some form of 'fixation' of the bone fragments; the 'fixation' being effected in some instances by wiring the main fragments, in others by the use of 'plates' and in others generally in the case of a small fragment (e.g. a portion of an articular surface) which has been fractured off and the use of a screw to fix the small to the large segment of the bone." In 1910, he published Fractures and their Treatment, a textbook which became a standard and authoritative work on fracture treatment for more than a generation.

== Hindquarter amputation ==
He was also a pioneer of hindquarter amputation, a radical operation involving division of the pubic symphysis and the sacroiliac joint, performing the first successful such amputation in Britain in 1900 for tuberculosis of the hip which had spread to the pelvis. He was the first in the world to perform the one stage procedure for sarcoma of the thigh. The size and relative success of Pringle's series may be judged by comparison with the subsequent experience of Sir Gordon Gordon-Taylor, widely regarded as a pioneer of the technique, who was generous in his praise of Pringle's technique and results.

== Head injury ==
Pringle developed expertise in head injury, working as assistant to Macewen, a pioneer of neurosurgery. Pringle's casebooks demonstrate the standard skull charts he devised for the recording of head injuries and the precise site and extent of skull fractures. In these casebooks he recorded the levels of consciousness, meticulous neurological examinations and fundoscopy which he had performed in such cases. These casebooks, neatly written and with meticulous coloured illustrations, offer an insight into the mind of a surgeon who was both painstaking and methodical.

== Melanoma ==
In 1908, Pringle published the first description of en-bloc excision for melanoma, reporting the procedure in two patients. Some thirty years later he was able to publish a follow-up reporting two of these cases alive and well, 30 and 38 years on. His description of en-block excision is much as is practised today and appears to be the first description of what was to become an accepted surgical treatment.

== Reconstructive arterial surgery ==
Pringle was the first surgeon in Britain to carry out a free vein graft. He did this using a saphenous vein graft to restore continuity after excision of a syphilitic aneurysm of the popliteal artery and characteristically in this paper he duly acknowledged the "splendid work of Carrel". Alexis Carrel had been the first surgeon to make an arterial anastomosis, work which led to his being awarded the Nobel Prize in Physiology or Medicine in 1912. The technical quality of Pringle's operative technique is demonstrated by the fact that in this pioneering operation "not one drop of blood escaped at either of the lines of suture and distal pulses were instantly restored".

== The Pringle manoeuvre ==
It is for the Pringle manoeuvre that his name remains known throughout the surgical world. The technique of occluding the portal triad to control haemorrhage in liver trauma which he described in the Annals of Surgery in 1908 is still widely used in modern hepatic surgery to minimise blood loss. Pringle's paper attests to the originality and logic of his thinking, often flying in the face of mainstream opinion. In describing his experience in dealing with liver injury he observed that portal triad occlusion controlled the bleeding from the liver sufficient to allow suturing or packing. "An assistant," he wrote, "held the portal vein and the hepatic artery between a finger and thumb and completely arrested all bleeding.”

== Later life ==
Pringle served in the First World War as a major in the RAMC at number 4 General Hospital at Stobhill, Glasgow. He retired from surgical practice in 1923 at the age of 60 and was elected Visitor (Vice-President) of the Faculty of Physicians and Surgeons of Glasgow in that year. He was a founder member of the Association of Surgeons of Great Britain and Ireland and of the Moynihan Chirurgical Club. He died at his home in Killearn, Scotland, on 24 April 1941 at the age of 78
