= Damage control surgery =

Surgical intervention

Damage control surgery is surgical intervention to keep the patient alive rather than correct the anatomy. It addresses the "lethal triad" for critically ill patients with severe hemorrhage affecting homeostasis leading to metabolic acidosis, hypothermia, and increased coagulopathy.

This lifesaving method has significantly decreased the morbidity and mortality of critically ill patients, though complications can result. It stabilizes patients for clinicians to subsequently reverse the physiologic insult prior to completing a definitive repair. While the temptation to perform a definitive operation exists, surgeons should avoid this practice because the deleterious effects on patients can result in them succumbing to the physiologic effects of the injury, despite the anatomical correction. The leading cause of death among trauma patients remains uncontrolled hemorrhage and accounts for approximately 30–40% of trauma-related deaths.

While typically trauma surgeons are heavily involved in treating such patients, the concept has evolved to other sub-specialty services. A multi-disciplinary group of individuals is required: nurses, respiratory therapist, surgical-medicine intensivists, blood bank personnel and others.

== Technique ==
Damage control surgery can be divided into the following three phases: Initial laparotomy, Intensive Care Unit (ICU) resuscitation, and definitive reconstruction. Each of these phases has defined timing and objectives to ensure best outcomes. The following goes through the different phases to illustrate, step by step, how one might approach this. There are clearly different approaches throughout the country, and no one way is necessarily correct. However, the ability to evaluate objectively the differences and then choose the one that fits your team is important.

=== Initial laparotomy ===
This is the first part of the damage control process whereby there are some clear-cut goals surgeons should achieve. The first is controlling hemorrhage followed by contamination control, abdominal packing, and placement of a temporary closure device. Minimizing the length of time spent in this phase is essential.

For groups (i.e., trauma centers) to be effective in damage control surgery, a multi-disciplinary team is critical. The approach to caring for such critically ill patients is dependent on nurses, surgeons, critical care physicians, operating room staff, blood bank personnel, and administrative support. In addition to having the right team in place is having a prepared team. The more facile the team is enhances the ability for centers to effectively implement damage control surgery. This is referred to by some as damage control ground zero (DC0). The ability to mobilize personnel, equipment, and other resources is bolstered by preparation; however, standardized protocols ensure that team members from various entities within the health care system are all speaking the same language. This has been seen during implementation of complex processes such as the massive transfusion protocol (MTP).

Controlling of hemorrhage as discussed above is the most important step in this phase. Eviscerating the intra-abdominal small bowel and packing all four abdominal quadrants usually helps surgeons establish initial hemorrhagic control. Depending up on the source of hemorrhage a number of different maneuvers might need to be performed allowing for control of aortic inflow. Solid organ injury (i.e., spleen, kidney) should be dealt with by resection. When dealing with hepatic hemorrhage a number of different options exist such as performing a Pringle maneuver that would allow for control of hepatic inflow. Surgeons can also apply manual pressure, perform hepatic packing, or even plugging penetrating wounds. Certain situations might require leaving the liver packed and taking the patient for angio-embolization or if operating in a hybrid operating room having perform an on table angio-embolization. Vessels that are able to be ligated should, and one should consider shunting other vessels that do not fall into this category. This has been described by Reilly and colleagues when they shunted the superior mesenteric artery to decrease the length of time in the operating room.

Once hemorrhage control is achieved one should quickly proceed to controlling intra-abdominal contamination from hollow-viscus organs. The perception might be that one could quickly perform an anastomosis. This should not be attempted in the damage control setting. The key is to simply prevent continued intra-abdominal contamination, and to leave patients in discontinuity. A number of different techniques can be employed such as using staplers to come across the bowel, or primary suture closure in small perforations. Once this is complete the abdomen should be packed. Many of these patients become coagulopathic and can develop diffuse oozing. It is important to not only pack areas of injury but also pack areas of surgical dissection. There are various methods that can be used to pack the abdomen. Packing with radiopaque laparotomy pads allow for the benefit of being able to detect them via X-ray prior to definitive closure. As a rule abdomens should not be definitively closed until there has been radiologic confirmation that no retained objects are present in the abdomen.

The final step of this phase is applying a temporary closure device. Numerous methods of temporary closure exist, with the most common technique being a negative-vacuum type device. Regardless of which method one decides to use it is important that the abdominal fascia is not reapproximated. The ability to develop abdominal compartment syndrome is a real concern and described by Schwab.

=== ICU resuscitation ===
On completion of the initial phase of damage control, the key is to reverse the physiologic insult that took place. This specifically relates to factors such as acidosis, coagulopathy, and hypothermia (lethal triad) that many of these critically ill patients develop. When developing a strategy to best care for these patients, the same principles of having a multi-disciplinary team that work together in parallel for the same result apply. The intensivist is critical in working with the staff to ensure that the physiologic abnormalities are treated. This typically requires close monitoring in the intensive care unit, ventilator support, and laboratory monitoring of resuscitation parameters (i.e., lactate).

In using a number of different resuscitation parameters, the critical care team can have a better idea as to which direction is progressing. The first 24 hours often require a significant amount of resources (i.e., blood products) and investment of time from personnel within the critical care team. In many circumstances, especially trauma patients, require that other specialties address a variety of injuries. Moving the patient early on, unless absolutely necessary, can be detrimental. Certain circumstances might require this, and the patients should continue to receive care from the critical care team during the entire transport period. As the literature begins to grow within the field of damage control surgery, the medical community is continuously learning how to improve the process. Certain pitfalls have also become evident, one of which is the potential to develop abdominal compartment syndrome.

In some cases, temporary abdominal closure itself or underlying conditions may contribute to abdominal compartment syndrome, causing increased intraabdominal pressure and compromising organ perfusion. Temporary abdominal dressings with high negative pressures can be a cause of recurrent abdominal compartment syndrome and one should not hesitate to turn off the dressing's suction when evaluating a patient with signs of recurrent abdominal compartment syndrome.

While it might sound counterintuitive since the fascia is left open during the placement of these temporary closure devices, they can create a similar type process that leads to abdominal compartment syndrome. If this occurs the temporary closure device should be taken down immediately.

=== Definitive reconstruction ===
The third step in damage control surgery is addressing closure of the abdomen. Definitive reconstruction occurs only when the patient is improving. At this point in process the critical care team has been able to correct the physiologic derangements. The optimization typically takes 24 to 48 hours, depending on how severe the initial insult is. Prior to being taken back to the operating room it is paramount that the resolution of acidosis, hypothermia, and coagulopathy has occurred.

The first step after removing the temporary closure device is to ensure that all abdominal packs are removed. Typically the number of packs has been documented in the initial laparotomy; however, an abdominal radiograph should be taken prior to definitive closure of the fascia to ensure that no retained sponges are left in the abdomen. Once the abdominal packs are removed the next step is to re-explore the abdomen allowing for the identification of potentially missed injuries during the initial laparotomy and re-evaluating the prior injuries. Attention is then turned to performing the necessary bowel anastomosis or other definitive repairs (i.e., vascular injuries).

An attempt should be made to close the abdominal fascia at the first take back, to prevent complications that can result from having an open abdomen. The concern for early closure of the abdomen with development of compartment syndrome is a real one. A method to pre-emptively evaluate whether fascial closure is appropriate would be to determine the difference in peak airway pressure (PAP) prior to closure and the right after closure. An increase of over 10 would suggest that the abdomen be left open. As mentioned above, it is important to obtain an abdominal radiograph to ensure that no retained sponges are left intra-operatively.

Considering that not all patients can undergo definitive reconstruction at first return, there are other options that surgeons can consider. Data would suggest that the longer the abdomen is left open from initial laparotomy the higher the rate of complications. After about one week, if surgeons can't close the abdomen, they should consider placing a Vicryl mesh to cover the abdominal contents. This lets granulation occur over a few weeks, with the subsequent ability to place a split-thickness skin graft (STSG) on top for coverage. These patients clearly have a hernia that must be fixed 9 to 12 months later.

== Resuscitation ==
Damage control resuscitation has had a dramatic impact on how care for critically ill patients is administered.. The core principles of resuscitation involve permissive hypotension, transfusion ratios, and massive transfusion protocol. The resuscitation period lets any physiologic derangements be reversed to give the best outcome for patient care.

=== Permissive hypotension ===
Typical resuscitation strategies have used an approach where aggressive crystalloid and/or blood product resuscitation is performed to restore blood volume. The term permissive hypotension refers to maintaining a low blood pressure to mitigate hemorrhage; however, continue providing adequate end-organ perfusion [Duchesene, 2010]. The key is to prevent exacerbation of hemorrhaging until definitive vascular control can be achieved, the theory being that if clots have formed within a vessel then increasing the patient's blood pressure might dislodge those established clots resulting in more significant bleeding. Permissive hypotension is not a new concept, and had been described in penetrating thoracic trauma patients during World War I by Bickell and colleagues demonstrating an improvement in both survival and complications.

Subsequent animal studies have shown equivalent outcomes with no real benefit in mortality Recently there has been further data in trauma patients that has demonstrated increased survival rates [Morrison, 2011]. Cotton and colleagues found that the use of a permissive hypotension resuscitation strategy resulted in better outcomes (increased 30-day survival) in those undergoing damage control laparotomy. This would not be used in situations where patients might have injuries such as a traumatic brain injury considering that such patients are excluded from the studies.

=== Transfusion ratios ===
For over a century the casualties of war have provided valuable lessons that can be applied within the civilian sector. Specifically the past decade has seen a paradigm shift in early resuscitation of critically injured patients. Instead of replacing blood volume with high volumes of crystalloid and packed red blood cells with the sporadic use of fresh frozen plasma and platelets, we have now learned that maintaining a transfusion ratio of 1:1:1 of plasma to red blood cells to platelets in patients requiring massive transfusion results in improved outcomes [Borgman 2007] While this was initially demonstrated in the military setting, Holcomb and colleagues extrapolated this to the civilian trauma center showing improved results as well Broad implementation across both the military and civilian sector has demonstrated a decreased mortality in critically injured patients. Debate has gone back and forth as to the correct ratio that should be used; however, recently Holcomb and colleagues published the Prospective Observational Multicenter Major Trauma Transfusion (PROMMTT) Study. They compared administration a higher ratio of plasma and platelets (1:1:1) compared to a lower ratio (1:1:2). The patients that received a higher ratio had an associated three to four-fold decrease in mortality. To help mitigate confounding variables a randomized control trial called the Pragmatic Randomized Optimal Platelet and Plasma Ratios (PROPPR) has been performed to evaluate the transfusion requirement. There was no difference in 24 hour or 30 day mortality between the 1:1:1 group and the 1:1:2 group - https://jamanetwork.com/journals/jama/fullarticle/2107789.

=== Massive transfusion protocol ===
Initial resuscitation of trauma patients continues to evolve. Massive transfusion (defined as receiving greater than or equal to 10 units of packed red blood cells with a 24-hour period) is required in up to 5% of civilian trauma patients that arrive severely injured. Patients who are arriving severely injured to trauma centers can be coagulopathic. Data suggests that around 25% of patients arrive with coagulopathy. New ways of measuring coagulopathy such at thromboelastography and rotational thromboelastometry have allowed for a more robust assessment of the coagulation cascade compared to traditional methods of measuring international normalized ratio allowing clinicians to better target areas of deficiency. For trauma teams to systematically and efficiently deliver blood products institutions have created protocols that allow for this. The protocols allow for clear communication between the trauma center, blood bank, nurses, and other ancillary staff. They also allow for the quick delivery of certain set of blood products depending upon the institution. One example might be that a “cooler” would contain 10 units of packed red blood cells, 10 units of plasma, and 2 packs of platelets. The idea is that the coolers would continue to be delivered to the location where the patient is being treated until the trauma team leader (typically the trauma surgeon) would discontinue the order. Systolic blood pressure <90 mmHg, hemoglobin <11 g/dL, temperature <35.5 °C, international normalized ratio > 1.5, base deficit ≥6 mEq/L, heart rate ≥120 bpm, presence of penetrating trauma, and Focused Abdominal Sonography Trauma exam have been evaluated to determine their predictive ability in patients arriving at trauma centers. All were predictive of the need of massive transfusion protocol except for temperature.

== History ==
Surgeons have used the concept of damage control surgery for years, and controlling hemorrhage with packing is over a century old. Pringle described this technique in patients with substantial hepatic trauma in the early twentieth century. The U.S. military did not encourage this technique during World War II and the Vietnam War. Lucas and Ledgerwood described the principle in a series of patients. Subsequent studies were repeated by Feliciano and colleagues, and they found that hepatic packing increased survival by 90%. This technique was then specifically linked to patients who were hemorrhaging, hypothermic, and coagulopathic. This extrapolation allowed for the first article in 1993 by Rotondo and Schwab specifically adapting the term “damage control”. This term was taken from the United States Navy who initially used the term as “the capacity of a ship to absorb damage and maintain mission integrity” (DOD 1996). This was the first article that brought together the concept of limiting operative time in these critically ill patients to allow for reversal of physiologic insults to improve survival. In addition, the description illustrated how the three phases of damage control surgery can be implemented. Since this description the development of this concept has grown both within the trauma community and beyond.

== Outcomes ==
The data that have been published regarding definitive laparotomy versus damage control surgery demonstrate a decrease in mortality when performed in the critically ill patient. Subsequent studies by Rotondo and colleagues in a group of 961 patients that had undergone damage control surgery demonstrate an overall mortality of 50% and a 40% morbidity rate.

There are four main complications. The first is development of an intra-abdominal abscess. This has been reported as high as 83%. Next is the development of an entero-atmospheric fistula, which ranges from 2 to 25%. The third is abdominal compartment syndrome that has been reported anywhere from 10 to 40% of the time. Finally fascial dehiscence has been shown to result in 9–25% of patients that have undergone damage control surgery.

== Bibliography ==
- Feliciano, David V.; Mattox, Kenneth L.; Moore, Ernest J (2012). Trauma, Seventh Edition (Trauma (Moore)). McGraw-Hill Professional. ISBN 978-0-07-166351-9.
- Wang, Chih-Hung; Hsieh, Wen-Han; Chou, Hao-Chang; Huang, Yu-Sheng; Shen, Jen-Hsiang; Yeo, Yee Hui; Chang, Huai-En; Chen, Shyr-Chyr; Lee, Chien-Chang (April 2014). "Liberal Versus Restricted Fluid Resuscitation Strategies in Trauma Patients". Critical Care Medicine. 42 (4): 954–961. doi:10.1097/CCM.0000000000000050. PMID 24335443. S2CID 44411659.
- Garner, Glen B; Ware, Drue N; Cocanour, Christine S; Duke, James H; McKinley, Bruce A; Kozar, Rosemary A; Moore, Frederick A (December 2001). "Vacuum-assisted wound closure provides early fascial reapproximation in trauma patients with open abdomens". The American Journal of Surgery. 182 (6): 630–638. doi:10.1016/S0002-9610(01)00786-3. PMID 11839329.
- Abikhaled, JA; Granchi, TS; Wall, MJ; Hirshberg, A; Mattox, KL (December 1997). "Prolonged abdominal packing for trauma is associated with increased morbidity and mortality". The American Surgeon. 63 (12): 1109–12, discussion 1112–3. PMID 9393261.
- Burch, JM; Ortiz, VB; Richardson, RJ; Martin, RR; Mattox, KL; Jordan GL, Jr (May 1992). "Abbreviated laparotomy and planned reoperation for critically injured patients". Annals of Surgery. 215 (5): 476–83, discussion 483–4. doi:10.1097/00000658-199205000-00010. PMC 1242479. PMID 1616384.
- Surface Ship Survivability. Naval War Publications 3-20.31. Washington, DC: Department of Defense; 1996.
- Teixeira, PG; Inaba, K; Salim, A; Brown, C; Rhee, P; Browder, T; Belzberg, H; Demetriades, D (October 2007). "Retained foreign bodies after emergent trauma surgery: incidence after 2526 cavitary explorations". The American Surgeon. 73 (10): 1031–4. doi:10.1177/000313480707301024. PMID 17983075. S2CID 28811296.
- Trauma.org - Damage Control Surgery overview
