= Hemoperitoneum =

Presence of blood in the space between the abdominal walls and organs

- Other names: Hematoperitoneum
- Specialty: Gastroenterology

Hemoperitoneum (also haemoperitoneum, sometimes also hematoperitoneum) is the presence of blood in the peritoneal cavity. The blood accumulates in the space between the inner lining of the abdominal wall and the internal abdominal organs. Hemoperitoneum is generally classified as a surgical emergency; in most cases, urgent laparotomy is needed to identify and control the source of the bleeding. In selected cases, careful observation may be permissible. The abdominal cavity is highly distensible and may easily hold greater than five liters of blood, or more than the entire circulating blood volume for an average-sized individual. Therefore, large-scale or rapid blood loss into the abdomen will reliably induce hemorrhagic shock and, if untreated, may rapidly lead to death.

== Causes ==
Causes of hemoperitoneum include:

- Penetrating trauma
- Blunt trauma, most commonly injuries to solid organs such as the liver and spleen.
- Vascular accidents, such as rupture of an abdominal aortic aneurysm, iliac aneurysm, or splenic aneurysm.
- Bleeding due to a ruptured ectopic pregnancy or uterine rupture.
- Rupture of corpus luteum in some cases.
- Less commonly, bleeding due to a perforated gastric ulcer.
- Bleeding due to rupture of an intra-abdominal neoplasm, (e.g., Hepatoblastoma)
- Disseminated intravascular coagulation
- People on high dose of anticoagulants (blood thinners)
- Perforation of the colon

== Diagnosis ==
Hemoperitoneum can be reliably diagnosed with the following examinations:

- Focused assessment with sonography for trauma (FAST)
- Paracentesis or diagnostic peritoneal lavage
- Computed tomography
- Diagnostic laparoscopy or exploratory laparotomy

== Treatment ==
Initial management consists of immediate blood transfusion if the patient is in hemorrhagic shock. Classically, hemoperitoneum was an indication for emergency surgery to locate the source of bleeding and also to recover spilled blood from the peritoneal cavity and to use it for auto-transfusion if it has not been contaminated by ruptured bowel contents. The method of control depends on the source of blood loss. Vascular bleeding, i.e. from a blood vessel, would be treated by clamping and ligation of the offending vessel, or repair of the vessel in the case of major arteries such as the aorta or mesenteric arteries. Bleeding from the spleen most often requires splenectomy, or removal of the spleen, usually but not always in the form of a total splenectomy. Bleeding from the liver might be controlled by application of hemostatic sponges, thrombin, or more recently, argon beam cauterization.

With modern diagnostic aids such as computed tomography (CT) scans, certain injuries such as low-grade lacerations of the spleen may be diagnosed early and observed, with surgical options deferred unless clinical deterioration obligates them. In rare occasions, rupture of an Abdominal Aortic Aneurysm may be repaired via an endovascular technique, though this is generally not performed in the setting of acute rupture.
