= Pringle manoeuvre =

General liver surgical technique

- A diagram showing a haemostat being used to clamp the hepatoduodenal ligament
- Specialty: General surgery
- Uses: Liver surgery
- Complications: Increased blood loss in patients with chronic venous insufficiency
- Approach: Open surgery. Compress hepatoduodenal ligament

The Pringle manoeuvre is a surgical technique used in some abdominal operations and in liver trauma. The hepatoduodenal ligament is clamped either with a surgical tool called a haemostat, an umbilical tape or by hand. This limits blood inflow through the hepatic artery and the portal vein, controlling bleeding from the liver. It was first published by and named after James Hogarth Pringle in 1908.

== Uses ==
The Pringle manoeuvre is used during liver surgery and in some cases of severe liver trauma to minimise blood loss. For short durations of use, it is very effective at reducing intraoperative blood loss. The Pringle manoeuvre is applied during closure of a vena cava injury when an atriocaval shunt is placed.

== Limits ==
The Pringle manoeuvre is more effective in preventing blood loss during liver surgery if central venous pressure is maintained at 5 mmHg or lower. This is due to the fact that Pringle manoeuvre technique aims at controlling the blood inflow into the liver, having no effect on the outflow. In case of using Pringle manoeuvre during liver trauma, should bleeding continue, it is likely that the inferior vena cava or the hepatic vein are also traumatised. If bleeding continues, a variation in arterial blood flow may be present.

== Adverse effects ==
The Pringle manoeuvre can directly lead to reperfusion injury in the liver, causing impaired function. This is particularly true for long durations of use, such as more than 120 minutes of intermittent Pringle occlusion.

== Technique ==
The Pringle manoeuvre consists in clamping the hepatoduodenal ligament (the free border of the lesser omentum). This interrupts the flow of blood through the hepatic artery and the portal vein, which helps to control bleeding from the liver. The common bile duct is also temporarily closed during this procedure. This can be achieved using:

- a large atraumatic haemostat (soft clamp).
- manual compression.
- vessel loop or umbilical tape.

== History ==
The Pringle manoeuvre was developed by James Hogarth Pringle in the early 1900s in order to attempt to control bleeding during severe liver traumatic injuries.
