= Diagnostic peritoneal lavage =

Surgical diagnostic procedure

- Other names: Diagnostic peritoneal aspiration
- ICD-9-CM: 54.25
- MeSH: D010533

Diagnostic peritoneal lavage (DPL) or diagnostic peritoneal aspiration (DPA) is a surgical diagnostic procedure to determine if there is free floating fluid (most often blood) in the abdominal cavity.

== Indications ==
This procedure is performed when intra-abdominal bleeding (hemoperitoneum), usually secondary to trauma, is suspected. In a hemodynamically unstable patient with high-risk mechanism of injury, peritoneal lavage is a means of rapidly diagnosing intra-abdominal injury requiring laparotomy, but has largely been replaced in trauma care by the use of a focused assessment with sonography for trauma (FAST scan) due to its repeatability, non-invasiveness and non-interference with subsequent computed tomography (CT scan). Abdominal CT and contrast duodenography may complement lavage in stable patients, but in an unstable or uncooperative persons, these studies are too time-consuming or require ill-advised sedation. Magnetic resonance imaging is extremely accurate for the anatomic definition of structural injury, but logistics limit its practical application in acute abdominal trauma. The procedure was first described in 1965 by Hauser Root.

== Procedure ==
After the application of local anesthesia, a vertical skin incision is made one third of the distance from the umbilicus to the pubic symphysis. The linea alba is divided and the peritoneum entered after it has been picked up to prevent bowel perforation. A catheter is inserted towards the pelvis and aspiration of material attempted using a syringe. If no blood is aspirated, 1 litre of warm 0.9% saline is infused and after a few (usually 5) minutes this is drained and sent for analysis.

== Interpretation of results ==
If any of the following are found then the DPL is positive and operative exploration is warranted:

- 10 cc/blood
- 100,000 RBCs/mm^{3}
- 500 WBCs/mm^{3}
- Presence of bile, bacteria or food particle
- Amylase level > 75 IU/mL
- Bilirubin level > 0.01 mg/dL
- ALP > 2 IU/L

== See also ==
- Peritoneal washing

== Bibliography ==
- Rosen, Peter; John J. Ratey MD; Marx, John A.; Robert I. Simon MD; Hockberger, Robert S.; Ron Walls MD; Walls, Ron M.; Adams, James L. (2010). Rosen's emergency medicine: concepts and clinical practice. St. Louis, Mo: Mosby/Elsevier. ISBN 978-0-323-05472-0.
