= Focused assessment with sonography for trauma =

Fluid accumulation screening

Focused assessment with sonography in trauma, a.k.a. FAST
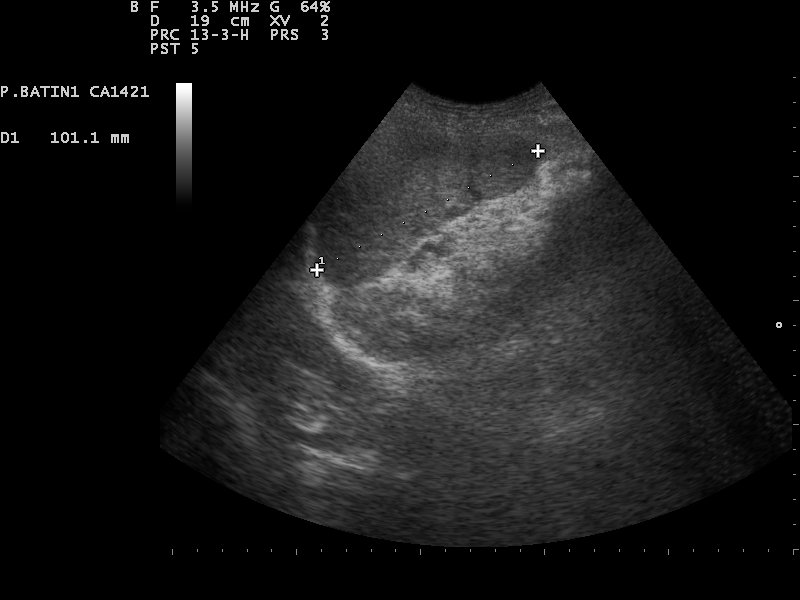
- Ultrasound image of a normal spleen that may be seen in part of the eFAST
- eMedicine: 104363

Focused assessment with sonography in trauma (commonly abbreviated as FAST) is a rapid bedside ultrasound examination performed by surgeons, emergency physicians, and paramedics as a screening test for sources of abnormal vitals including low blood pressure and fast heart rate such as blood around the heart (pericardial effusion) or abdominal organs (hemoperitoneum) after trauma. The exam can also be expanded through the extended FAST (E-FAST) which includes additional ultrasound views to assess for pneumothorax or blood in the lungs (hemothorax). FAST exam is a low risk and efficient test that may be useful prior to conducting more sensitive tests such as CT in a stable trauma patient. CT remains the gold standard for diagnosing free fluid, ruptures and lacerations.

Before the evolution of ultrasound and its rapid availability in hospitals, surgeons and emergency physicians used Diagnostic Peritoneal Lavage (DPL) which is an invasive procedure to diagnose hemoperitoneum. In the 1990s the FAST exam using the ultrasound became widely popular after advancement in Europe that showed the specificity around 98% while also allowing for faster and cheaper diagnosis of trauma patients, particularly unstable who may not be able to make it to the CT.

The four classic areas that are examined for free fluid (blood) are the perihepatic space (including Morison's pouch or the hepatorenal recess), perisplenic space, pericardium, and the pelvis. With this technique it is possible to identify the presence of moderate to large amounts of intraperitoneal or pericardial free fluid, which in the setting of trauma, will usually be due to bleeding. The FAST exam is poor at detecting smaller amounts of free fluid with the sensitivity of ultrasound around 85% with 150mL of fluid making it useful for quick evaluation of trauma patients but not the gold standard.

== Indications ==
Reasons a FAST or E-FAST would be performed would be:

1. Blunt abdominal trauma
2. Penetrating abdominal trauma
3. Blunt thoracic trauma
4. Penetrating thoracic trauma
5. Undifferentiated shock/unexplained hypotension (low blood pressure)
6. Ectopic pregnancy

== Contraindications ==
Since the FAST/E-FAST is performed with ultrasound, there is very little risk to the patient as ultrasounds only emit sound waves and record the echo to create a picture rather than radiation. Therefore, there are few contraindications or harms to the patient. The most common relative contraindication would be delay of more accurate imaging or definitive care such as surgical intervention in the hemodynamically unstable patient.

There are some limitations of the FAST exam including user error, early bleeding, retroperitoneal (posterior) bleeding and body size.

== Extended FAST ==
The E-FAST allows for the assessment of a patient's lungs by adding views of the lungs using sonography to the FAST exam. This allows for the detection of a collapsed lung known as a pneumothorax with the absence of normal ‘lung-sliding’ and ‘comet-tail’ artifact seen on the ultrasound. Compared with supine chest radiography, bedside sonography has superior sensitivity (49–99% versus 27–75%), similar specificity (95–100%), and can be performed in under a minute, this making it well suited to settings without immediate access to more accurate investigations such as CT scanning. Several recent prospective studies have validated its use in the setting of trauma resuscitation, and have also shown that ultrasound can provide an accurate estimation of pneumothorax size. Although radiography or CT scanning is generally feasible, immediate bedside detection of a pneumothorax confirms what are often ambiguous physical findings in unstable patients. In addition, in the patient undergoing positive-pressure ventilation, the detection of an unknown pneumothorax prior to CT scanning may hasten treatment and subsequently prevent development of a tension pneumothorax, a deadly complication if not treated immediately, and deterioration while in the CT scanner.

=== Components of the examination ===
During a FAST exam typically a curvilinear probe is chosen due to its ability to obtain good images of organs and deeper areas. When viewing the lungs in the E-FAST a linear probe is preferred due to the increase in frequency allowing better images of superficial organs. Next the components of the exam include:

1. Right upper abdomen: Called the perihepatic area and views an area called Morison's pouch in between the liver and kidney.
2. Left upper abdomen: The perisplenic view that is the area between the spleen and the left kidney.
3. Pelvic: Views of the bladder in 2 orientations allows for view of free fluid around the bladder or injury to the bladder from blunt trauma.
4. Cardiac: Views are obtained subxiphoid which allow for viewing if there is fluid around the heart and its motion.

In the E-FAST the lung views are added using the linear probe to determine if there is a collapsed lung(pneumothorax) or fluid in the lung (pleural effusion/hemothorax).

=== Findings ===
Lung sliding to rule out pneumothorax

E-FAST allows the emergency physician or a surgeon the ability to determine whether a patient has a pneumothorax, hemothorax, pleural effusion efficiently without needing CT scanners. The exam allows for visualization of the organs and spaces where free fluid may pool due to injury. Few radiographic signs are important in the visualization of fluid in a trauma. These include the stratosphere sign, the sliding or seashore sign, and the sinusoid sign.

Stratosphere sign or Barcode sign is an ultrasound finding usually in an E-FAST examination that shows a presence of a collapsed lung also known as a pneumothorax. The sign is an imaging finding using a linear ultrasound probe in between the 4th and 5th rib in the anterior clavicular line using the motion tracing (M-Mode) of the machine. This finding is seen in the "M-mode" tracing as pleura and lung being indistinguishable as a row of lines and is fairly reliable for diagnosis of a pneumothorax. Even though the stratospheric sign can be an indication of pneumothorax its absence is not reliable to rule out pneumothorax as definitive diagnosis usually requires X-ray or CT of thorax.

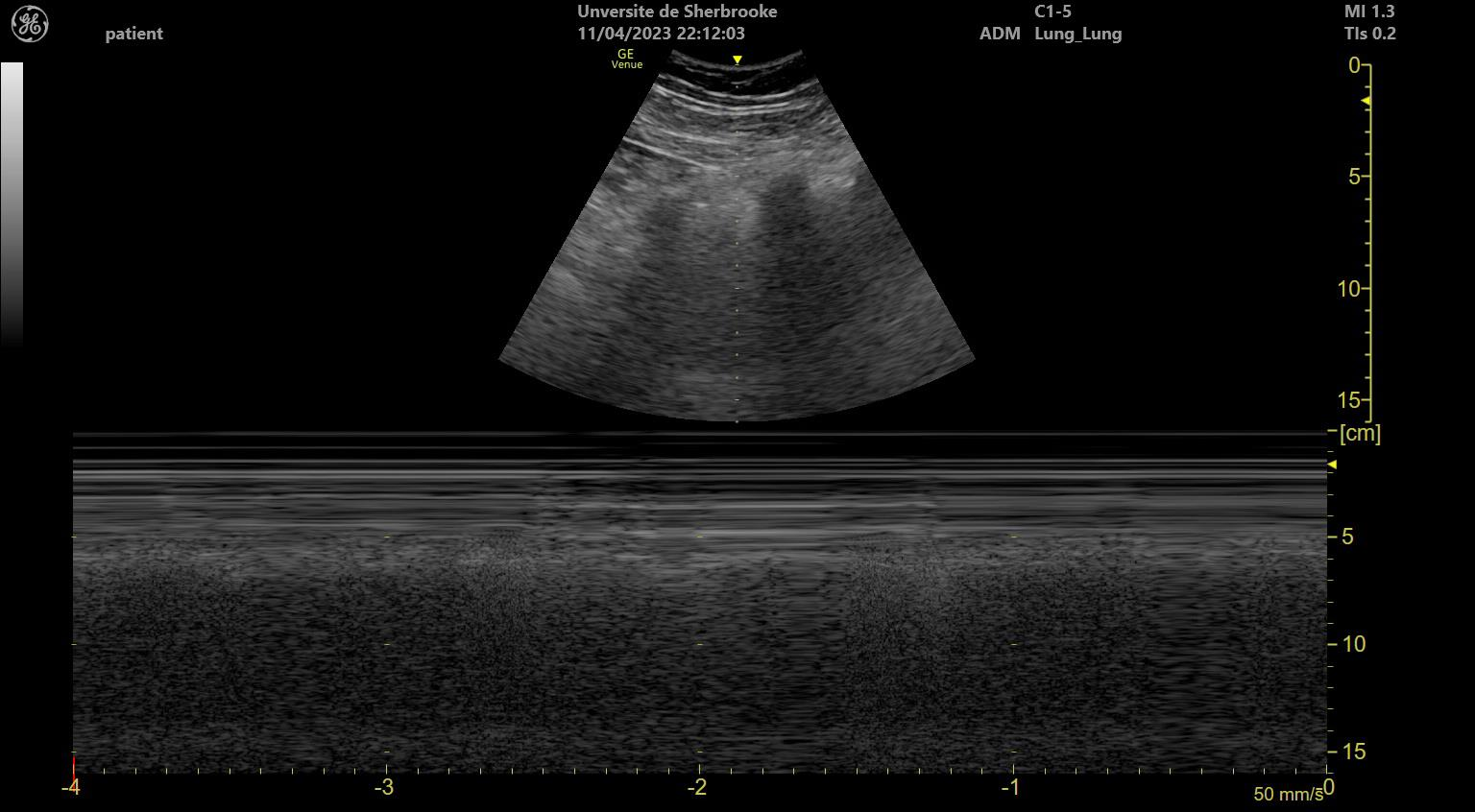
Seashore sign using M mode on ultrasound showing the moving lung and absence of pneumothorax

Seashore sign is another E-FAST finding in the lungs using "M-mode" that depicts the echogenicity of the lung next to the linear appearance of the visceral pleura that surrounds the lungs. This sign is a normal finding indicating no pneumothorax.

B-lines or "comet trails" are echogenic bright linear reflections beneath the pleura that are usually lost with any air between the probe and the lung tissue and therefore whose presence with seashore sign indicates absence of a pneumothorax.

Sinusoid sign is another M-mode finding indicating presence of fluid in the lungs also known as a pleural effusion. Due to the cyclical movement of the lung in inspiration and expiration, the motion-time tracing (M-mode) ultrasound shows a sinusoid appearance between the fluid and the line of tissue. This finding indicates possible fluid in the lungs (pleural effusion), accumulation of debris from infection (empyema), blood in pleural space (hemothorax).

== Advantages ==
FAST is less invasive than diagnostic peritoneal lavage which was previously used more frequently, involves no exposure to radiation and is cheaper compared to computed tomography (CT). However, compared with CT, FAST cannot accurately rule out life-threatening injuries and is of limited value in settings where CT is readily available.

Numerous studies have shown FAST is useful in evaluating trauma patients. It also appears to make emergency department care more efficient and improve access to critically ill patients.

Negative FAST but full stomach

Negative FAST but full stomach

Negative FAST but full stomach

== Interpretation ==
FAST Algorithm

The FAST exam is most useful in trauma patients who are hemodynamically unstable to guide surgical interventions. A positive FAST is defined as the appearance of a dark ("anechoic") strip in the dependent areas of the peritoneum or abdominal cavity indicating free fluid or blood which may be the source of the instability. In the right upper quadrant this typically appears in Morison's Pouch (between the liver and kidney). This location is most useful as it is the place where fluid will collect with a patient laying flat (supine). In the left upper quadrant, blood may collect anywhere around the spleen (perisplenic space). In the pelvis, blood generally pools behind the bladder. A positive result suggests hemoperitoneum; often CT scan will be performed if the patient is stable or if unstable will be taken for a laparotomy. However, this may be a false positive in many menstruating women as free fluid may be seen behind the uterus between the rectum (Pouch of Douglas) normally and would require clinical correlation.

In those with a negative FAST result, a search for extra-abdominal sources of bleeding may still need to be performed. FAST cannot reliably rule out all bleeding or life-threatening injury including posterior sources or small amounts/early bleeding that cannot be detected by ultrasound.

The value of FAST in situations where there is rapid access to CT or surgical intervention is limited, as a positive FAST requires either further investigation in the stable patient, or an operation in the unstable patient. A negative FAST cannot rule out injury but helps quickly rule in possible sources to get patient's more efficient targeted treatment which has decreased patient stay length and cost of treatment.

== See also ==
- HEART scan
