= Injury prevention =

Effort to prevent bodily injuries

Injury prevention is an effort to prevent or reduce the severity of bodily injuries caused by external mechanisms, such as accidents, before they occur. Injury prevention is a component of safety and public health, and its goal is to improve the health of the population by preventing injuries and hence improving quality of life. Among laypersons, the term "accidental injury" is often used. However, "accidental" implies the causes of injuries are random in nature. Researchers prefer the term "unintentional injury" to refer to injuries that are nonvolitional but often preventable. Data from the U.S. Centers for Disease Control show that unintentional injuries are a significant public health concern: they are by far the leading cause of death from ages 1 through 44. During these years, unintentional injuries account for more deaths than the next three leading causes of death combined. Unintentional injuries also account for the top ten sources of nonfatal emergency room visits for persons up to age 9 and nine of the top ten sources of nonfatal emergency room visits for persons over the age of 9.

Injury prevention strategies cover a variety of approaches, many of which are classified as falling under the "3 Es" of injury prevention: education, engineering modifications, and enforcement/enactment of policies. Some organizations and researchers have variously proposed the addition of equity, empowerment, emotion, empathy, evaluation, and economic incentives to this list.

== Measuring effectiveness ==
Injury prevention research can be challenging because the usual outcome of interest is deaths or injuries prevented and it is difficult to measure how many people did not get hurt who otherwise would have. Education efforts can be measured by changes in knowledge, attitudes, and beliefs and behaviors before and after an intervention; however, tying these changes back into reductions in morbidity and mortality is often problematic. Effectiveness of injury prevention interventions is typically evaluated by examining trends in morbidity and mortality in a population may provide some indication of the effectiveness of injury prevention interventions. Online databases, such as the Web-based Injury Statistics Query and Reporting System (WISQARS) allow both researchers and members of the public to measure shifts in mortality over time.

== Common types ==
=== Traffic and automobile safety ===
Traffic safety and automobile safety are a major component of injury prevention because it is the leading cause of death for children and young adults into their mid 30s. Injury prevention efforts began in the early 1960s when activist Ralph Nader exposed automobiles as being more dangerous than necessary in his book Unsafe at Any Speed. This led to engineering changes in the way cars are designed to allow for more crush space between the vehicle and the occupant. The Centers for Disease Control and Prevention (CDC) also contributes significantly to automobile safety. CDC Injury Prevention Champion David Sleet illustrated the importance of lowering the legal blood alcohol content limit to 0.08 percent for drivers, requiring disposable lighters to be child resistant; and using evidence to demonstrate the dangers of airbags to young children riding in the front seat of vehicles.

Engineering: vehicle crash worthiness, seat belts, airbags, locking seat belts for child seats.

Education: promote seat belt use, discourage impaired driving, promote child safety seats.

Enforcement and enactment: passage and enforcement of primary seat belt laws, speed limits, impaired driving enforcement.

=== Pedestrian safety ===
Pedestrian safety is the focus of both epidemiological and psychological injury prevention research. Epidemiological studies typically focus on causes external to the individual such as traffic density, access to safe walking areas, socioeconomic status, injury rates, legislation for safety (e.g., traffic fines), or even the shape of vehicles, which can affect the severity of injuries resulting from a collision. Epidemiological data show children aged 1–4 are at greatest risk for injury in driveway and sidewalks. Children aged 5–14 are at greatest risk while attempting to cross streets.

Psychological pedestrian safety studies extend as far back as the mid-1980s, when researchers began examining behavioral variables in children. Behavioral variables of interest include selection of crossing gaps in traffic, attention to traffic, the number of near hits or actual hits, or the routes children chose when crossing multiple streets such as while walking to school. The most common technique used in behavioral pedestrian research is the pretend road, in which a child stands some distance from the curb and watches traffic on the real road, then walks to the edge of the street when a crossing opportunity is chosen. Research is gradually shifting to more ecologically valid virtual reality techniques.

=== Home safety ===
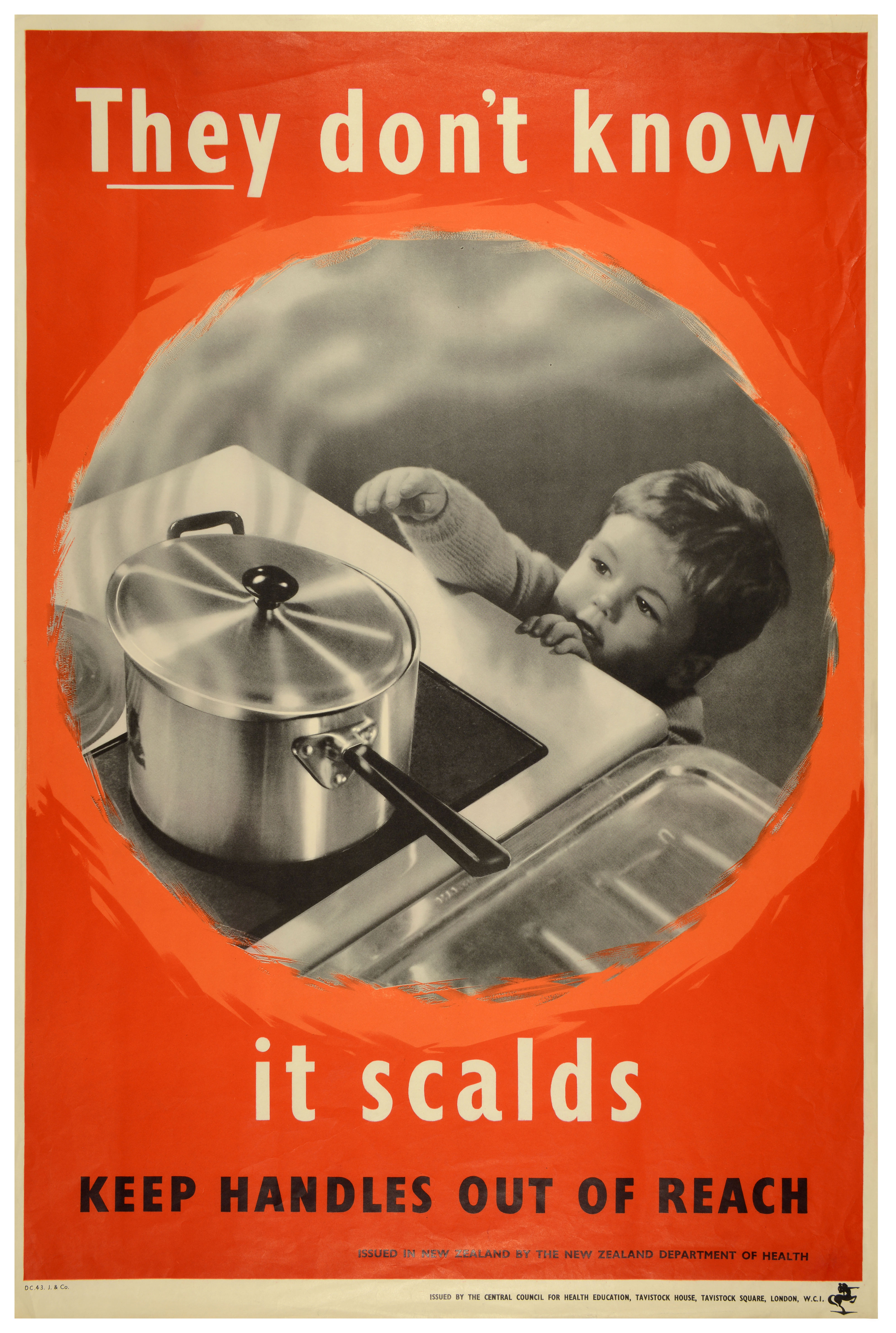
Child injury prevention poster from New Zealand

Home accidents including burns, drownings, and poisonings are the most common cause of death in industrialized countries. Efforts to prevent accidents such as providing safety equipment and teaching about home safety practices may reduce the rate of injuries.

=== Occupational safety and health ===
Occupational safety and health (OSH) is the science of forecasting, recognizing, evaluating and controlling of hazards arising in or from the workplace that could impair the health and wellbeing of workers. This area is necessarily vast, involving a large number of disciplines and numerous workplace and environmental hazards. Liberalization of world trade, rapid technological progress, significant developments in transport and communication, shifting patterns of employment, changes in work organization practices, and the size, structure and lifecycles of enterprises and of new technologies can all generate new types and patterns of hazards, exposures and risks. A musculoskeletal injury is the most common health hazard in workplaces. The elimination of unsafe or unhealthy working conditions and dangerous acts can be achieved in a number of ways, including by engineering control, design of safe work systems to minimize risks, substituting safer materials for hazardous substances, administrative or organizational methods, and use of personal protective equipment.

=== Other ===
The following is an abbreviated list of other common focal areas of injury prevention efforts:

- Bicycle safety
- Boat and water safety
- Consumer product safety
- Farm Safety
- Firearm safety
- Fire and burn safety
- Impaired driving
- Poison control
- Toy safety
- Traffic safety
- Sports injury safety

== See also ==
- U.S. Consumer Product Safety Commission
- Haddon Matrix
- Home Safety Council
- National Highway Traffic Safety Administration
- National Institute for Occupational Safety and Health
- Accident Analysis and Prevention
- Journal of Injury and Violence Research
- Injury Prevention
- International Journal of Injury Control and Safety Promotion
- Journal of Safety Research
- Journal of Trauma
- Traffic Injury Prevention
