= National Traffic and Motor Vehicle Safety Act =

United States federal law

- Long title: An Act to provide for a coordinated national safety program and establishment of safety standards for motor vehicles in interstate commerce to reduce accidents involving motor vehicles and to reduce the deaths and injuries occurring in such accidents.
- Enacted by: the 89th United States Congress

Citations
- Public law: Pub. L. 89–563
- Statutes at Large: 80 Stat. 718

Legislative history
- Introduced in the Senate as S. 3005 on March 2, 1966; Passed the Senate on June 24, 1966; Passed the House on August 17, 1966; Signed into law by President Lyndon B. Johnson on September 9, 1966

The National Traffic and Motor Vehicle Safety Act was enacted in the United States in 1966 to empower the federal government to set and administer new safety standards for motor vehicles and road traffic safety. The Act was the first mandatory federal safety standards for motor vehicles. The Act created the National Highway Safety Bureau (now National Highway Traffic Safety Administration). The Act was one of a number of initiatives by the government in response to increasing number of cars and associated fatalities and injuries on the road following a period when the number of people killed on the road had increased 6-fold and the number of vehicles was up 11-fold since 1925. The reduction of the rate of death attributable to motor-vehicle crashes in the United States represents the successful public health response to a great technologic advance of the 20th century—the motorization of the United States.

== History ==
Systematic motor-vehicle safety efforts began during the 1960s. In 1960, unintentional injuries caused 93,803 deaths; 41% were associated with motor-vehicle crashes. In 1966, after Congress and the general public had become thoroughly horrified by five years of skyrocketing motor-vehicle-related fatality rates, the enactment of the Highway Safety Act created the National Highway Safety Bureau (NHSB), which later became the National Highway Traffic Safety Administration (NHTSA). The systematic approach to motor-vehicle-related injury prevention began with NHSB's first director, William Haddon. Haddon, a public health physician, recognized that standard public health methods and epidemiology could be applied to preventing motor-vehicle-related and other injuries. He defined interactions between host (human), agent (motor vehicle), and environmental (highway) factors before, during, and after crashes resulting in injuries. Tackling problems identified with each factor during each phase of the crash, NHSB initiated a campaign to prevent motor-vehicle-related injuries.

When he signed the bill into law on September 9, 1966, President Lyndon B. Johnson noted that while 29 American soldiers had died over the recent Labor Day weekend, 614 Americans died in automobile accidents. In 1966, passage of the Highway Safety Act and the National Traffic and Motor Vehicle Safety Act authorized the federal government to set and regulate standards for motor vehicles and highways, a mechanism necessary for effective prevention. The Highway Safety Act resulted in the national adoption of the Manual on Uniform Traffic Control Devices, while the National Traffic and Motor Vehicle Safety Act led to the national adoption of the Federal Motor Vehicle Safety Standards.

Many changes in both vehicle and highway design followed this mandate. Vehicles (agent of injury) were built with new safety features, including head rests, energy-absorbing steering wheels, shatter-resistant windshields, and safety belts. Roads (environment) were improved by better delineation of curves (edge and center line stripes and reflectors), use of breakaway sign and utility poles, improved illumination, addition of barriers separating oncoming traffic lanes, and guardrails. The results were rapid. By 1970, motor-vehicle-related death rates were decreasing by both the public health measure (deaths per 100,000 population) and the traffic safety indicator (deaths per VMT).

Changes in driver and passenger (host) behavior also have reduced motor-vehicle crashes and injuries. Enactment and enforcement of traffic safety laws, reinforced by public education, have led to safer behavior choices. Examples include enforcement of laws against driving while intoxicated (DWI) and underage drinking, and enforcement of seat belt, child safety seat, and motorcycle helmet use laws.

Government and community recognition of the need for motor-vehicle safety prompted initiation of programs by federal and state governments, academic institutions, community-based organizations, and industry. NHTSA and the Federal Highway Administration within the U.S. Department of Transportation have provided national leadership for traffic and highway safety efforts since the 1960s. The National Center for Injury Prevention and Control, established at CDC in 1992, has contributed public health direction. State and local governments have enacted and enforced laws that affect motor-vehicle and highway safety, driver licensing and testing, vehicle inspections, and traffic regulations. Preventing motor-vehicle-related injuries has required collaboration among many professional disciplines (such as biomechanics has been essential to vehicle design and highway safety features). Citizen and community-based advocacy groups have played important prevention roles in areas such as drinking and driving and child-occupant protection. Consistent with the public/ private partnerships that characterize motor-vehicle safety efforts, NHTSA sponsors "Buckle Up America" week, which focuses on the need to secure children in child-safety seats properly at all times.

== Specific public health concerns ==
=== High-Risk Populations ===
- Alcohol-impaired: From 1982 to 1997, the annual motor-vehicle crash-related fatalities involving alcohol decreased by 39% to approximately 16,000; these deaths accounted for 38.6% of all traffic deaths. Factors that may have contributed to this decline included increased public awareness of the dangers of drinking and driving; new and tougher state laws; stricter law enforcement; an increase in the minimum legal drinking age; prevention programs that offer alternatives such as safe rides (e.g., taxicabs and public transportation), designated drivers, responsible alcohol-serving practices and a decrease in per capita alcohol consumption.
- Young drivers and passengers: From 1975 to 1997, motor-vehicle-related fatality rates had decreased 27% for young motor-vehicle occupants (ages 16–20 years). However, in 1997 the death rate was 28.3 per 100,000 population—more than twice that of the U.S. population (13.3 per 100,000 population). Some teenagers are more likely than adult drivers to speed, run red lights, make illegal turns, ride with an intoxicated driver, and drive after drinking alcohol or using drugs. Strategies that had contributed to improved motor-vehicle safety among young drivers included laws restricting purchase of alcohol among underaged youths and some aspects of graduated licensing systems (e.g., restrictions related to nighttime driving).
- Pedestrians: From 1975 to 1997, pedestrian fatality rates decreased 41%, from 4 per 100,000 population in 1975 to 2.3 in 1997 but still account for 13% of motor-vehicle-related deaths. Factors that may have reduced pedestrian fatalities included more and better sidewalks, pedestrian paths, playgrounds away from streets, one-way traffic flow, and restricted on-street parking.

=== Occupant-Protection Systems ===
Safety belts: In response to legislation, highly visible law enforcement, and public education, rates of safety belt use nationwide had increased from approximately 11% in 1981 to 68% in 1997 (8). Safety belt use began to increase following enactment of the first state mandatory-use laws in 1984. In 1997, all states except New Hampshire had seat belt laws. Primary laws (which allow police to stop vehicles simply because occupants are not wearing safety belts) are more effective than secondary laws (which require that a vehicle be stopped for some other traffic violation). The prevalence of safety belt use after enactment of primary laws increased 1.5-4.3 times, and motor-vehicle-related fatality rates decreased 13%-46%.

Child-safety and booster seats: All states had passed child passenger protection laws, but these varied widely in age and size requirements and the penalties imposed for noncompliance. Child-restraint used in 1996 was 85% for children aged less than 1 year and 60% for children aged 1–4 years. From 1975 to 1997, deaths among children aged less than 5 years had decreased 30% to 3.1 per 100,000 population, but rates for age groups 5–15 years had declined by only 11%-13%. Child seats were misused by as many as 80% of users In addition, parents failed to recognize the need for booster seats for children who were too large for child seats but not large enough to be safely restrained in an adult lap-shoulder belt.

== Sources ==
Reported by: Div of Unintentional Injury Prevention, National Center for Injury Prevention and Control, CDC.

== Related Journal ==
Traffic Injury Prevention

== See also ==
- Road-traffic safety
