= George Yannis =

Professor at National Technical University of Athens

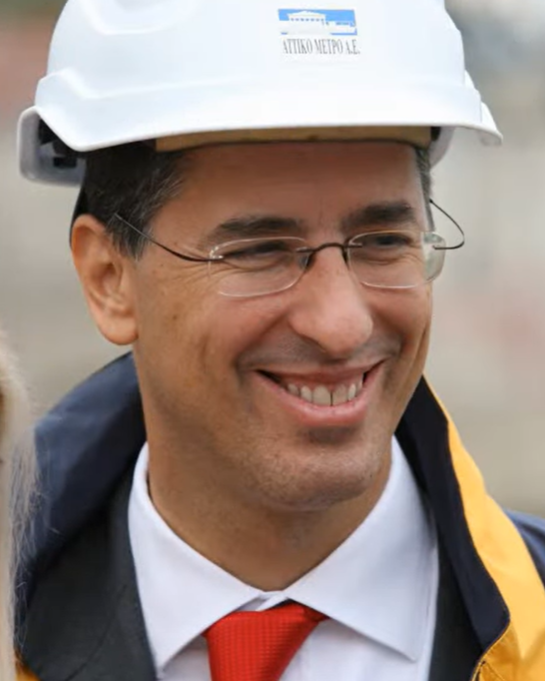
- Yannis in January 2005.

Personal details
- Born: 18 November 1964 (age 61) Athens, Greece
- Education: National Technical University of Athens; Ecole Nationale des Ponts et Chaussées

George Yannis (born 18 November 1964) is a Greek Civil Transportation Engineer. He is a Professor in Traffic and Safety Engineering and Director of Traffic Engineering Laboratory of the School of Civil Engineering at the National Technical University of Athens (NTUA), Greece.

== Early life and education ==
George Yannis was born in Athens and raised in downtown Athens, where he still lives. In 1982, he graduated from the 10th Athens Public School in Ampelokipoi. From 1982 to 1987, he attended the National Technical University of Athens and received a Diploma's degree in civil engineering (transport engineering option). He then obtained a Master's degree in Transport Engineering (1988) and a PhD (Doctorate) in Transport from the Ecole Nationale des Ponts et Chaussées in Paris (1993).

== Transportation engineering career ==
George Yannis contributed to national plans and policies, having conceived the Athens Metro development plan of eight lines (including the famous line 4 currently in development) (2009), the Athens city parking scheme (2002), the first Sustainable Urban Mobility Policy for Greece (2008), the introduction of green vehicle annual fee (2009), the Piraeus Port traffic arrangements and pedestrian paths (2004).

During his term as Chairman of the Athens Metro (Μετρό Αθήνας) Public Authority (2004–2010), he contributed at all phases of the planning, design, tendering, supervision, commissioning and acceptance of the metro construction projects in Athens and Thessaloniki, as well as of their accompanying projects. During this period, he contributed to the development of metro projects in Greece, including Athens 2004 Olympic projects and several metro lines, stations and parking lots. He also worked on the large second generation of metro projects including the Thessaloniki Metro main project and extensions.

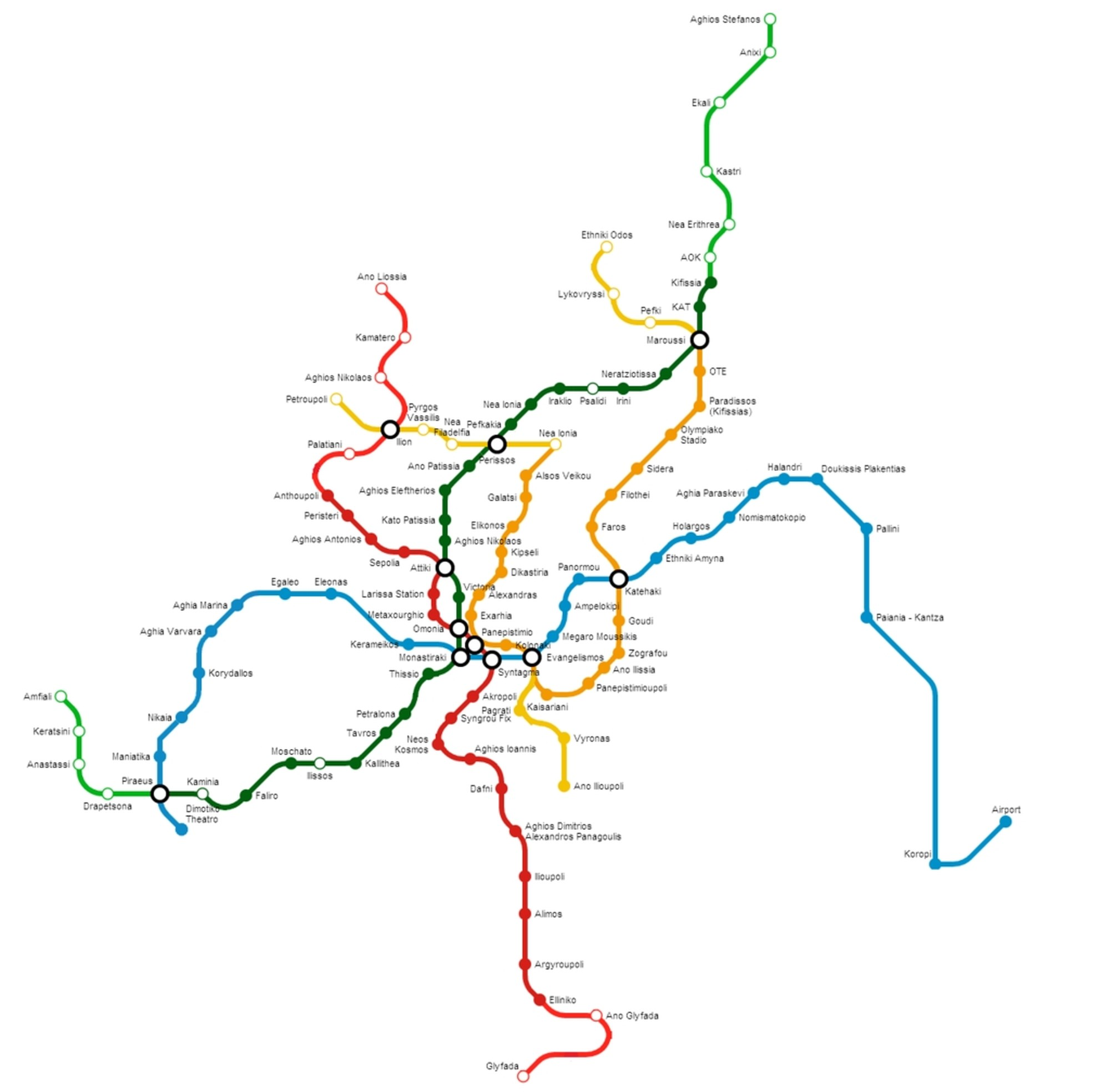
"The Souflias plan" inspired and developed by the then-president of Attiko Metro, George Yannis in April 2009.

On April 13, 2009, the Minister of the Environment, Physical Planning and Public Works, Georgios Souflias, unveiled a proposal for future Metro extensions under preparation, called "the Souflias plan". The plan envisioned a total of 8 lines to be developed over a 25-year period, and was initially inspired and developed by George Yannis, the then-president of Attiko Metro, following detailed studies and public consultations.

He has provided scientific support to the controversial Athens Great Walk urban regeneration project, which has been partially implemented to gradually transform Athens down-town mobility patterns, despite the initial strong inertia reactions.

== Academic career ==
Since 1991 he has contributed in more than 300 of national and international road safety and transportation research and engineering projects carried out at the Department of Transportation Planning and Engineering of the School of Civil Engineering of the National Technical University of Athens (Faculty Member since 2000).

He has published more than 1,000 scientific papers (citations i10-index: googlescholar: 264, h-index: googlescholar: 65, scopus: 49). He serves as Associate Editor and Editorial Board Member of the international scientific journals in the field (Accident Analysis & Prevention, Journal of Safety Research, Safety Science, Advances in Transportation Studies, Sensors, Transportation Letters, etc.).

== Running career ==
George Yannis is passionate about running, having finished 85 Marathon races, as well as several other road, trail and triathlon races, in Greece and in Europe. His first Marathon was at the age of 18 and his best performance is 2 hours 56 minutes in Athens at the age of 21. By the age of 35 he had completed 20 Marathons and after a 15-year running break (1999-2014), during the last decade he completed another 65 Marathons.

In November 2024 in Athens, he successfully completed a campaign to run 30 Marathons in 30 months in order to actively promote the adoption of city-wide 30km/h speed limit in as many cities as possible worldwide, as a key policy for safer, healthier and greener cities. The global impact of the campaign included over 400,000 views and 100,000 visitors per year to the campaign's websites and social media, along with numerous traditional media interviews on TV, and publications in scientific journals and conferences.

== Awards ==
His research and academic achievements have been recognised with several international scientific awards, including the European Union TRAVisions Senior Researcher Award, the "Knight of the Order of Academic Palms" by the French Government, the Belgian Universities Franqui Chair Award and the Prince Michael International Road Safety Award (four times).

== Books ==
- Ziakopoulos, Apostolos; Yannis, George (2024). Key Artificial Intelligence and Digitalization Solutions Towards Vision Zero in Road Safety. In Springer Nature, Studies in Systems, Decision and Control (SSDC), Volume 563. doi: 10.1007/978-3-031-69487-5 1.
- Oikonomou, Maria G.; Sekadakis, Marios; Ziakopoulos, Apostolos; Tengg, Allan; Yannis, George (2024). Integrated Traffic Simulation Developer Suite for Shared Automated Mobility. In Springer Nature, Lecture Notes in Mobility (LNMOB). doi: 10.1007/978-3-031-71793-2 13.
- Petraki, Virginia; Ziakopoulos, Apostolos; Fragkiadaki, Evangelia; Karouzakis, Nikolaos; Kakavoulis, Konstantinos; Yannis, George (2024). Providing State-Supported Financial Incentives and Benefits for Vehicle Insurance Policies Using Telematics. Strengthening European Mobility Policy. doi: 10.1007/978-3-031-67936-0 7.
- Nævestad, Tor-Olav; Laiou, Alexandra; Yannis, George (2020). Safety Culture Among Car Drivers and Motorcycle Riders in Norway and Greece: Examining the Influence of Nationality, Region, and Transport Mode. Frontiers in Sustainable Cities. Volume 2. doi: 10.3389/frsc.2020.00023.

Full reference in monographs and chapters in books: https://www.nrso.ntua.gr/geyannis/publications/

== Personal life ==
George Yannis is the son of Dimitrios Yannis and Chryssanthi Bouza, both originated from Greece's North-Western Region of Epirus. His parents are from the villages of Vitsa, Zagori and Palaiochori Syrrako, Metsovo. He has two brothers: Nicos and Alexandros. He is married to Vassiliki Lerouni, a lawyer. They have two children: Dimitrios and Panagiotis.

He has lived in Athens, Paris and Brussels.
