= Journal of Injury and Violence Research =

- Discipline: Traumatology, Injury prevention, Public health
- Language: English
- Edited by: Mahmoudreza Moradi

Publication details
- History: 2009–present
- Publisher: Kermanshah University of Medical Sciences (Iran)
- Frequency: Semiannual
- Open access: Yes

Standard abbreviations
- ISO 4: J Inj Violence Res

Indexing
- ISSN: 2008-2053 (print); 2008-4072 (web)

Links
- Journal homepage

Journal of Injury and Violence Research (JIVR) is a peer-reviewed, open-access medical journal published by Kermanshah University of Medical Sciences. Established in 2009, the journal publishes research on traumatology, injury epidemiology and prevention, violence, road safety, self-harm and suicide, and related areas of clinical medicine and public health. It is published in English and has a semiannual publication frequency.

The journal has been indexed in MEDLINE and PubMed from volume 1, issue 1, published in July 2009, and its full-text content is available through PubMed Central. The U.S. National Library of Medicine lists the journal as indexed for MEDLINE and classifies it broadly under traumatology.

== History ==
The journal began publication in 2009 under the auspices of Kermanshah University of Medical Sciences. According to the editorial published in its inaugural issue, the journal was established following approximately three years of preparation, with the aim of creating an interdisciplinary forum for research and discussion in injury and violence prevention, treatment, and related clinical practice.

The first issue was volume 1, number 1, dated July 2009. MEDLINE and PubMed coverage included the journal from that first issue. The journal initially appeared in both print and electronic formats; printed issues ceased with volume 12, number 2, in July 2020, while electronic publication continued.

In addition to its regular January and July issues, JIVR has periodically published conference supplements and special issues, including supplements associated with volumes published in 2012, 2019, 2022, 2023, and 2024.

== Scope ==
JIVR describes its scope as multidisciplinary and centered on the study of injury and violence, publishing quantitative and qualitative work in clinical and basic sciences involving trauma and injury prevention.

Areas covered by the journal include burns, drowning, falls, occupational injuries, road and sports safety, youth violence, child and elder abuse, intimate-partner and sexual violence, self-harm and suicide, patient safety, safe communities, disaster management, injury surveillance, and the burden of injury, alongside other intentional and unintentional injuries. Independent bibliographic classification is broadly consistent with this scope, with the National Library of Medicine assigning the subject term Traumatology and relevant MeSH headings.

== Publication model and peer review ==
JIVR is an open-access journal. According to the journal's author guidelines, authors are not charged publication fees, and published articles are distributed under the Creative Commons Attribution License (CC BY).

Submitted manuscripts undergo a double-blind peer-review process by at least two anonymous reviewers selected by the editors.

== Abstracting and indexing ==
The journal is indexed in several major bibliographic databases and research infrastructures, including:

- MEDLINE / PubMed / PubMed Central
- PsycINFO
- Crossref
- OpenAlex
- SafetyLit
- Index Medicus for the Eastern Mediterranean Region (IMEMR)

== Editorial organization ==
- Chair: Babak Izadi MD
- Editor-in-Chief: Mahmoudreza Moradi MD
- Founder and Deputy Editor: Alireza Ahmadi MD, PhD, FCPM

== See also ==
- List of medical journals
