= Traumatology =

Medicine branch

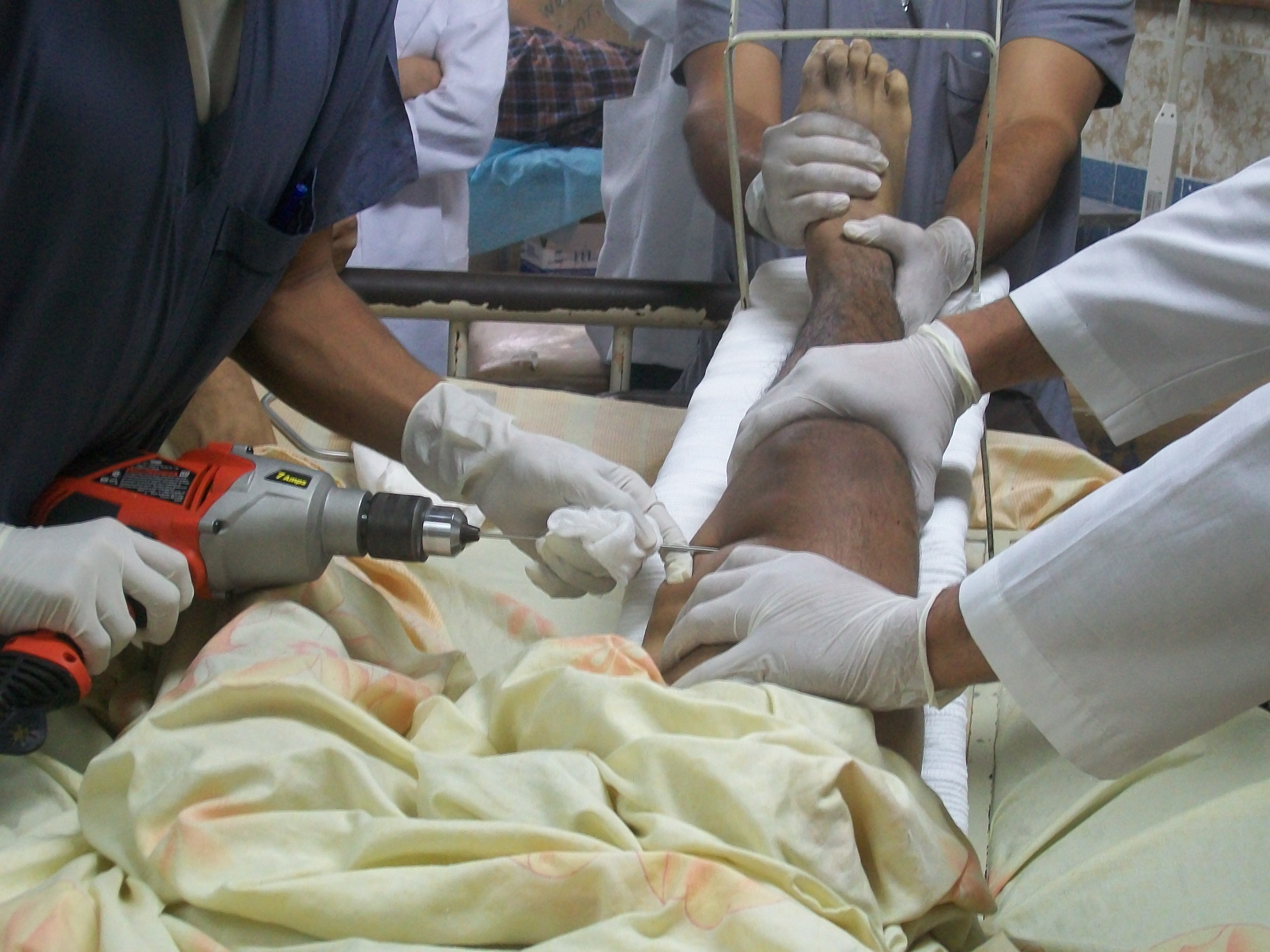
Infixing a distal femoral traction pin, preopt for a fractured femur.

In medicine, traumatology (from Greek trauma, meaning injury or wound) is the study of wounds and injuries caused by accidents or violence to a person, and the surgical therapy and repair of the damage. Traumatology is a branch of medicine. It is often considered a subset of surgery and in countries without the specialty of trauma surgery it is most often a sub-specialty to orthopedic surgery. Traumatology may also be known as accident surgery.

== Branches ==
Branches of traumatology include medical traumatology and psychological traumatology. Medical traumatology can be defined as the study of specializing in the treatment of wounds and injuries caused by violence or general accidents. This type of traumatology focuses on the surgical procedures and future physical therapy a patient needs to repair the damage and recover properly.

Psychological traumatology deals with damage to one's psychological wellbeing caused by distressing events. This type of trauma can also be the result of overwhelming amounts of stress in one's life. Psychological trauma usually involves some type of physical trauma that poses a threat to one's survival and sense of security. Psychological trauma often leaves people feeling overwhelmed, anxious, and threatened. Trauma can also be classified as:

- Acute: It results from a single stressful or dangerous situation.
- Chronic: It results from repeated and prolonged exposure to highly stressful situations.
- Complex: It results from exposure to multiple traumatic events.

Secondary or vicarious trauma, is another form of trauma in which a person develops trauma symptoms from close contact with someone who has experienced a traumatic event.

== Types of trauma ==
When it comes to types of trauma, medical and psychological traumatology go hand in hand. Types of trauma include car accidents, gunshot wounds, concussions, PTSD from incidents, etc. Medical traumas are repaired with surgeries; however, they can still cause psychological trauma and other stress factors. For example, a teenager in a car accident who broke his wrist and needed extensive surgery to save his arm may experience anxiety when driving in a car post-accident. PTSD can be diagnosed after a person experiences one or more intense and traumatic events and react with fear with complaints from three categorical symptoms lasting one month or longer. These categories are: re-experiencing the traumatic event, avoiding anything associated with the trauma, and increased symptoms of increased psychological arousal.

== Guidelines for essential trauma care ==
Airway management, monitoring, and management of injuries are all key guidelines when it comes to medical trauma care. Airway management is a key component of emergency on-scene care. Using a systematic approach, first responders must assess that a patient's airway is not blocked in order to ensure the patient gets enough circulation and remain as calm as they can. Monitoring patients and making sure their body does not go into shock is another essential guideline when it comes to medical trauma care. Nurses are required to watch over patients and check blood pressure, heart rate, etc. to make sure that patients are doing well and are not crashing. When it comes to managing injuries, head and neck injuries require the most care post surgery. Head injuries are one of the major causes of trauma related death and disabilities worldwide. It is important for patients of head trauma to get CT scans post surgery to insure that there are no problems.

== Guidelines for psychological trauma care ==
There is a range of approaches to assist victims to overcome the anxiety and stress that follows psychological trauma. Affected persons can also follow self-care such as exercise and socializing with familiar and safe associates and family members. Trauma disturbs the body's natural equilibrium by putting it in a state of fear and hyper-arousal. Exercising for thirty minutes a day facilitated the nervous system to "unfreeze" from a traumatic state. Being surrounded by a good support system is a powerful factor in treating psychological trauma. Participating in social activities, volunteering, and making new friends are all ways to help forget about or cope with traumatic events. Coming to terms with childhood trauma is especially challenging.

== Patient assessment ==
- Advanced trauma life support, training for medical doctors dealing with trauma
- Revised Trauma Score
- Injury Severity Score
- Abbreviated Injury Scale
- Triage

== Wound assessment ==
Factors in the assessment of wounds are:

- the nature of the wound, whether it is a laceration, abrasion, bruise or burn
- the size of the wound in length, width and depth
- the extent of the overall area of tissue damage caused by the impact of a mechanical force, or the reaction to chemical agents in, for example, fires or exposure to caustic substances.

Forensic physicians, as well as pathologists may also be required to examine (traumatic) wounds on people.

== See also ==
- Journal of Injury and Violence Research
- Major trauma
- Polytrauma
- Trauma surgery
- Traumatology (journal)
