= William Haddon =

American public health researcher (1926–1985)

William Haddon Jr.
- Born: May 24, 1926; Orange, New Jersey, US
- Died: March 4, 1985 (aged 58); Washington, DC, US
- Known for: Haddon Matrix

Academic background
- Education: MIT; Harvard University

Academic work
- Institutions: New York State Department of Health; NHTSA; Insurance Institute for Highway Safety

William Haddon Jr. (May 24, 1926 – March 4, 1985) was an American public health researcher and occupational safety official. He was regarded as a pioneer in injury epidemiology from his extensive field research and the invention of the Haddon matrix, which classifies injury prevention and control strategies according to different factors. Haddon is also an authority in highway safety. He created the first federal safety motor vehicle model legislation, which influenced state and local laws on drunken driving and requirements that motorcyclists wear helmets.

== Education and career ==
Haddon studied at the Massachusetts Institute of Technology and received a bachelor's degree in food technology. He went on to obtain his medical degree from Harvard Medical School and also obtained a master's degree in epidemiology at the Harvard School of Public Health. From 1957 to 1961, Haddon was the Director of the Driver Research Center of the New York State Department of Health and the New York State Department of Motor Vehicles. In 1966, Haddon was appointed the first administrator of the National Traffic Safety Agency (now part of the National Highway Traffic Safety Administration) by then US president Lyndon B. Johnson, where he was responsible for setting up the first Federal Motor Vehicle Safety Standards. Haddon worked there for three years before resigning. He became the first president of the Insurance Institute for Highway Safety from 1969 until his death from kidney failure in 1985. Starting in 1972, Haddon was also the president of the Highway Loss Data Institute, which collects traffic accidents data.

== Honors and awards ==
In 1963, the National Safety Council presented its Metropolitan Life Award of Merit to Haddon for research in accident prevention. In 1969, Haddon was awarded the Bronfman Prize for Public Health Achievement by the American Public Health Association. In 1975, he received the Association for the Advancement of Automotive Medicine Award.
