= PoliScan speed =

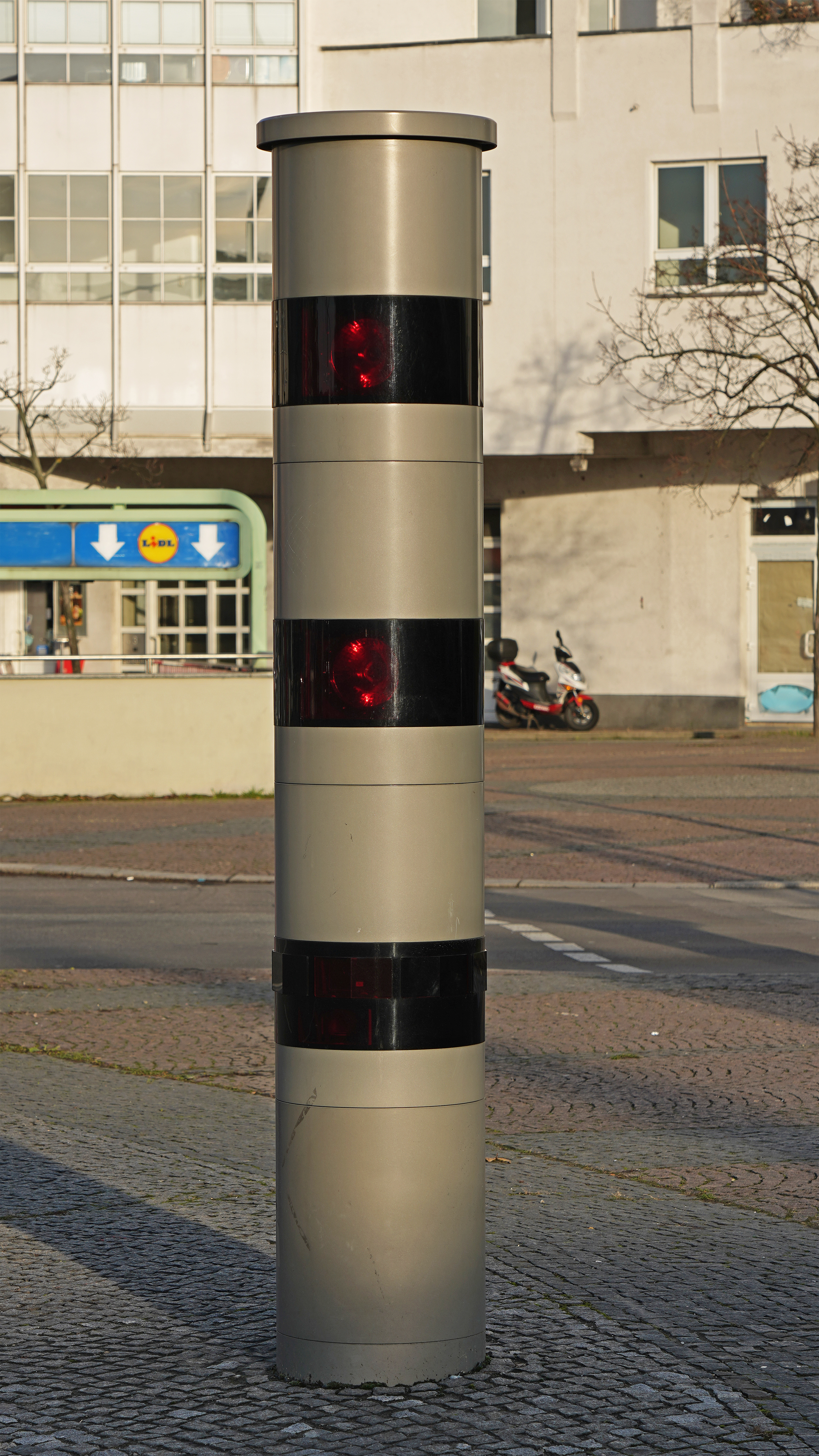
"PoliScan speed" stationary system in Berlin

PoliScan speed is a system for traffic enforcement made by Vitronic. The measurement is based on lidar (light radar). By time-of-flight measurement, a scanning laser determines speeds and positions of all vehicles in the measurement area.

PoliScan speed is available as a mobile or a stationary system.

Apart from the use as speed camera, the systems of the PoliScan family are also used as red light camera and for automatic number plate recognition.

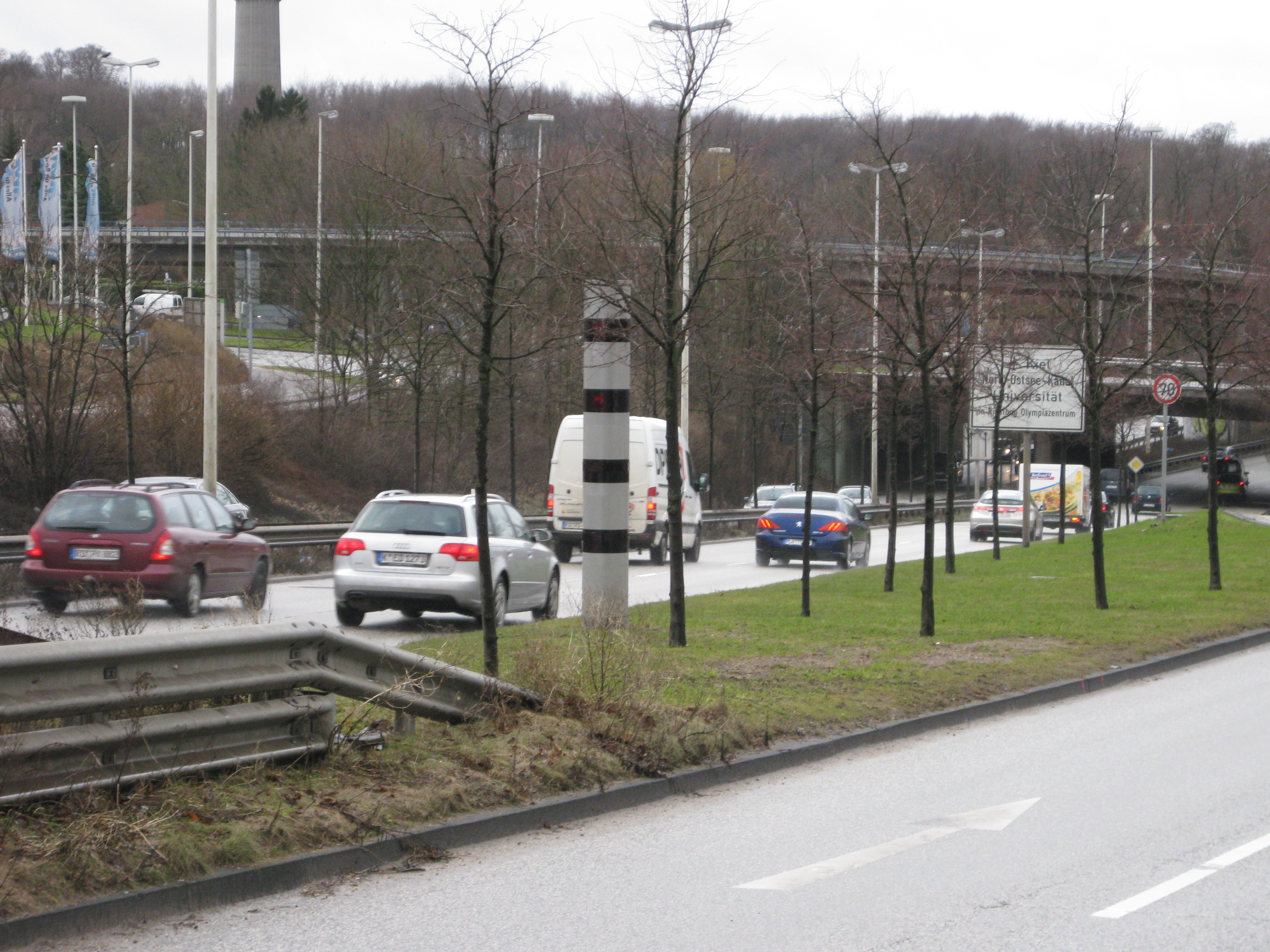
stationary system for multiple lanes

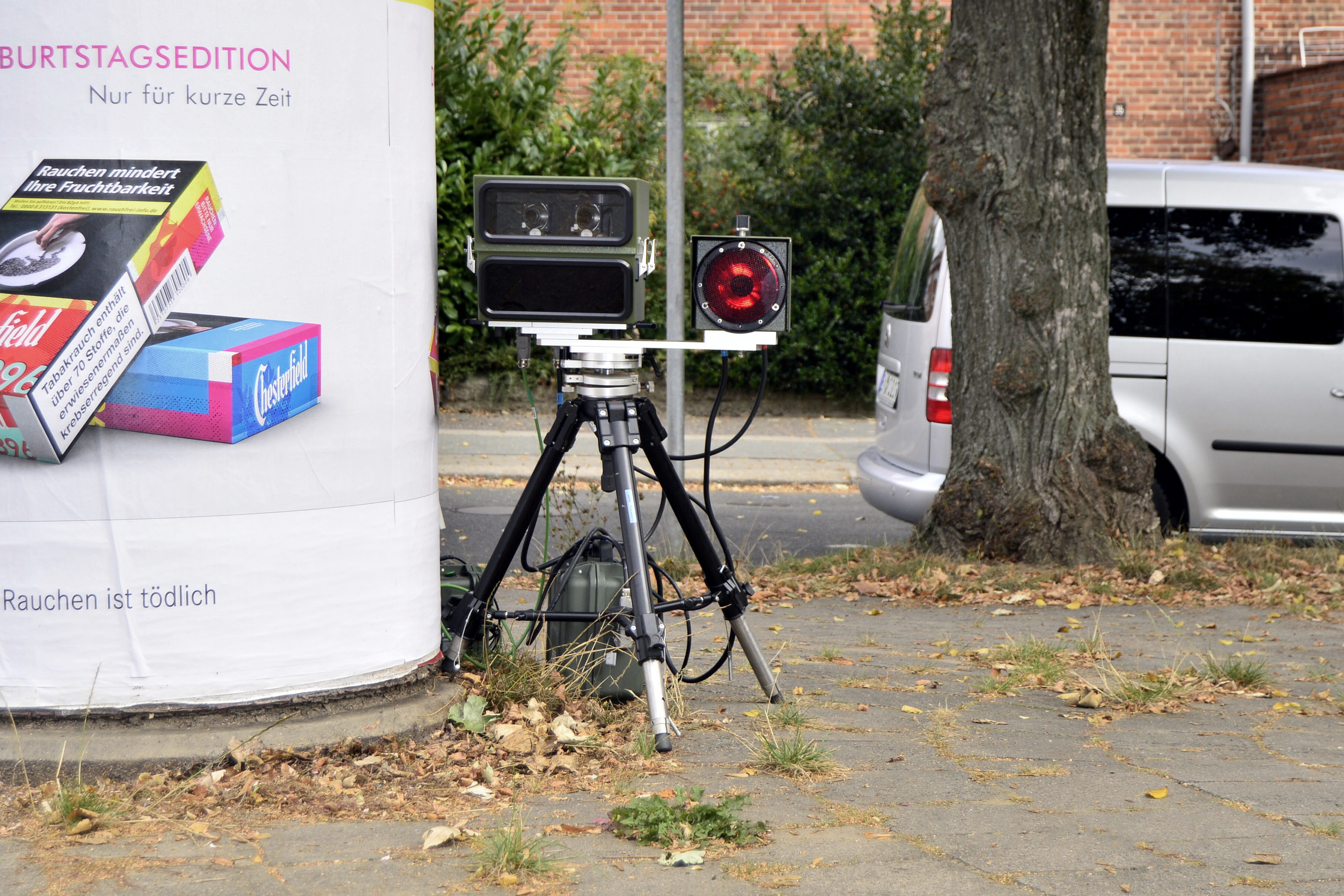
mobile system
