= International Journal of Injury Control and Safety Promotion =

- Discipline: Ergonomics, traumatology, product safety
- Language: English
- Edited by: Geetam Tiwari, Samuel N. Forjuoh, Shrikant Bangdiwala

Publication details
- History: 1994-present
- Publisher: Taylor & Francis
- Frequency: Quarterly
- Open access: Hybrid
- Impact factor: 0.875 (2016)

Standard abbreviations
- ISO 4: Int. J. Inj. Control Saf. Promot.

Indexing
- ISSN: 1745-7300 (print); 1745-7319 (web)
- OCLC no.: 60246461

Links
- Journal homepage; Online access; Online archive

The International Journal of Injury Control and Safety Promotion is a peer-reviewed scientific journal covering research in ergonomics, product safety, and the prevention and care of injuries. It is published by Taylor & Francis and is an official journal of the European Association for Injury Prevention and Safety Promotion (EuroSafe), formerly the European Consumer Safety Association (ECOSA). JCR: According to the Journal Citation Reports, the journal has a 2016 impact factor of 0.875.

== History ==
The journal was established in 1994 as the International Journal for Consumer and Product Safety. It was renamed to Injury Control and Safety Promotion in 2000, before obtaining its current name in 2005. It was published by Æolus Press for ECOSA until 1999 and then by Swets & Zeitlinger, until that company was acquired in 2003 by Taylor & Francis.
