= Red light camera =

Type of traffic enforcement camera

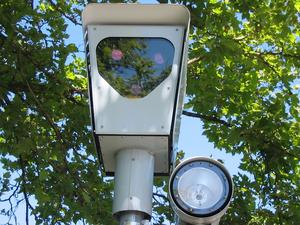
A red-light camera in use in Beaverton, Oregon

A red light camera (short for red light running camera) is a type of traffic enforcement camera that photographs a vehicle that has entered an intersection after the traffic signal controlling the intersection has turned red. By automatically photographing vehicles that run red lights, the photo is evidence that assists authorities in their enforcement of traffic laws. Generally the camera is triggered when a vehicle enters the intersection (passes the stop-bar) after the traffic signal has turned red.

Typically, a law enforcement official will review the photographic evidence and determine whether a violation occurred. A citation is then usually mailed to the owner of the vehicle found to be in violation of the law. These cameras are used worldwide, in China, in European countries, and in countries including: Australia, New Zealand, Canada, Indonesia, the United Kingdom, Singapore and the United States. More than 75 countries worldwide use red light cameras.

If a proper identification of the driver cannot be made, instead of a ticket, some jurisdictions send out a notice of violation to the owner of the vehicle, requesting identifying information so that a ticket may be issued later. Other jurisdictions simply assess a fine to the owner of the vehicle and make no attempt to determine personal responsibility for the offence beyond that; in such locales owners are responsible for collecting the fine from the offending driver (assuming it is not themselves); however, such jurisdictions generally do not assign demerit points or other personal consequences for traffic offences caught on camera.

According to the Insurance Institute for Highway Safety, red-light running is a frequent cause of crashes, with 6,000 people killed between 1992 and 1998, 850 each year in the United States alone, while 1.4 million were injured. In Australia, 15% to 21% of the crashes at signalized intersections were related to red light running during 1994–1998.

There is debate and ongoing research about the use of red light cameras. Authorities cite public safety as the primary reason that the cameras are installed, while opponents contend their use is more for financial gain. There have been concerns that red light cameras scare drivers (who want to avoid a ticket) into more sudden stops, which may increase the risk of rear-end collisions. The elevated incentive to stop may mitigate side collisions. Some traffic signals have an all red duration, allowing a grace period of a few seconds before the cross-direction turns green. Some studies have confirmed more rear-end collisions where red light cameras have been used, while side collisions decreased, but the overall collision rate has been mixed. A systematic review summarized evidence from 38 studies and found that overall, red-light cameras are effective at reducing right angle crashes and related injuries, as well as total injuries, but they also lead to an increase in rear end crashes. In some areas, the length of the yellow phase has been increased to provide a longer warning to accompany the red-light-running-camera. There is also concern that the international standard formula used for setting the length of the yellow phase ignores the laws of physics, which may cause drivers to inadvertently run the red phase.

== History ==
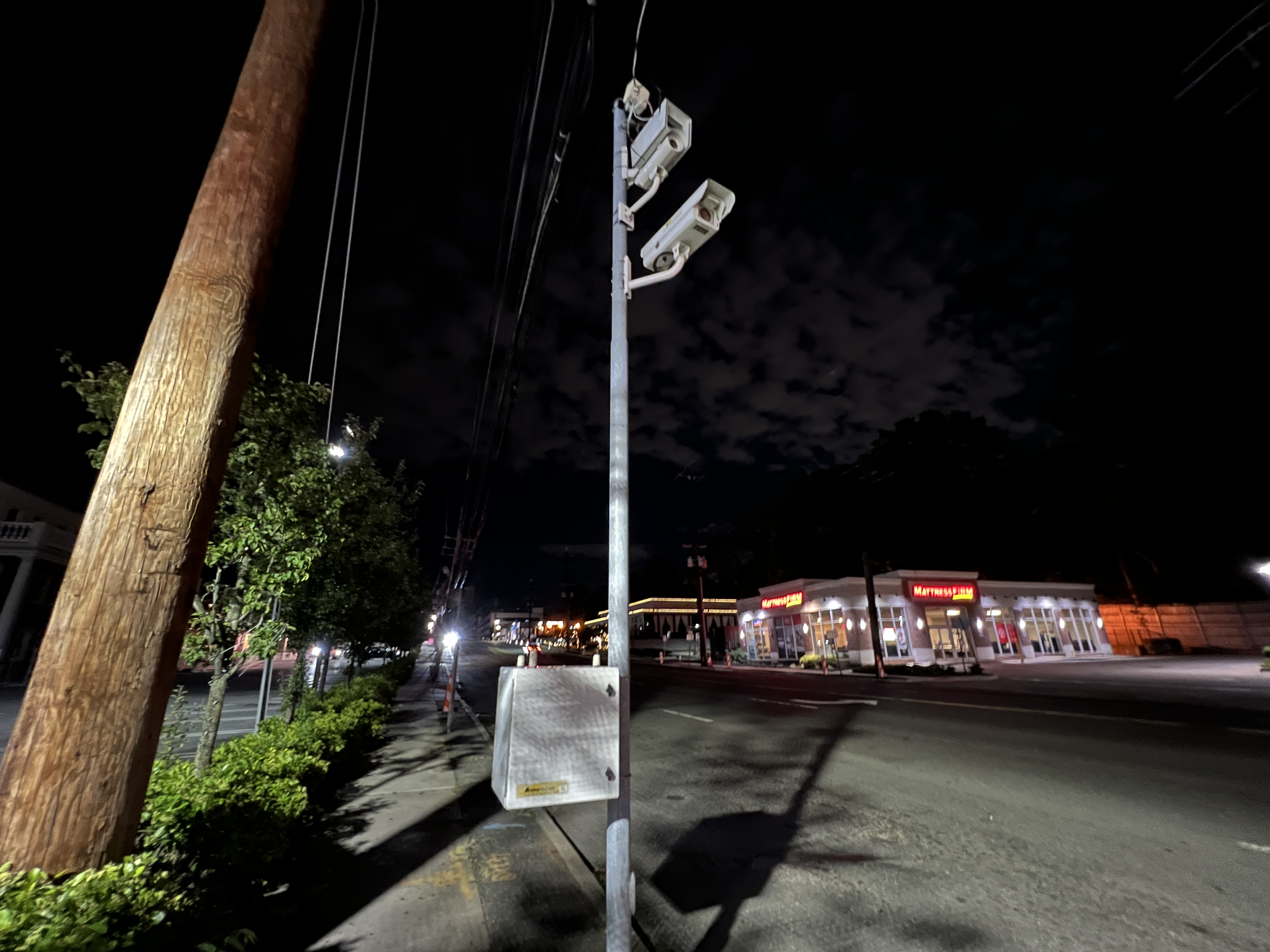
An Axsis RLC-300 red-light camera in Flower Hill, New York

Red light cameras were first developed in the Netherlands by Gatso. Worldwide, red light cameras have been in use since the 1960s, and were used for traffic enforcement in Israel as early as 1969. The first red light camera system was introduced in 1965, using tubes stretched across the road to detect the violation and subsequently trigger the camera. One of the first developers of these red light camera systems was Gatsometer BV.

The cameras first received serious attention in the United States in the 1980s following a highly publicized crash in 1982, involving a red-light runner who collided with an 18-month-old girl in a stroller (or "push-chair") in New York City. Subsequently, a community group worked with the city's Department of Transportation to research automated law-enforcement systems to identify and ticket drivers who run red lights. New York's red-light camera program went into effect in 1993. From the 1980s onward, red light camera usage expanded worldwide, and one of the early camera system developers, Poltech International, supplied Australia, Britain, South Africa, Taiwan, the Netherlands and Hong Kong. American Traffic Systems (subsequently American Traffic Solutions) (ATS) and Redflex Traffic Systems emerged as the primary suppliers of red light camera systems in the US, while Jenoptik became the leading provider of red light cameras worldwide.

Initially, all red light camera systems used film, which was delivered to local law enforcement departments for review and approval. The first digital camera system was introduced in Canberra in December 2000, and digital cameras have increasingly replaced the older film cameras in other locations since then.

== Operation ==
Red light cameras are typically installed in protective metal boxes attached to poles at intersections, which are often specifically chosen due to high numbers of crashes and/or red-light-running violations. In some case, cameras are built into traffic lights. Red light camera systems typically employ a sensor that detects the presence of a vehicle past the stop bar, and, in some cases, measures the speed of a vehicle at the time it ran the red light. The sensors may be single or dual inductive loops, piezoelectric strips, laser, radar or optical video analyses. Using the speed measured, the system predicts if a particular vehicle will not be able to stop before entering the intersection. In some instances the system takes two or more photographs. The first photo shows the vehicle just before it enters the intersection, with the light showing red, and the second photo, taken a second or two later, shows the vehicle when it is in the intersection.

Details that may be recorded by the camera system (and later presented to the vehicle owner) include: the date and time, the location, the vehicle speed, the amount of time elapsed since the light turned red, and the amount of time elapsed since the light turned yellow and the vehicle passed into the intersection. The event is captured as a series of photographs or a video clip, or both, depending on the technology used, which shows the vehicle before it enters the intersection on a red light signal and its progress through the intersection. The data and images, whether digital or developed from film, are sent to the relevant law enforcement agency. There, the information is typically reviewed by a law enforcement official or police department clerk, who determines if a violation occurred and, if so, approves issuing a citation to the vehicle owner, who may challenge the citation.

Studies have shown that 38% of violations occur within 0.25 seconds of the light turning red and 79% within one second. A few red light camera systems allow a grace period of up to half a second for drivers who pass through the intersection just as the light turns red. Ohio and Georgia introduced a statute requiring that one second be added to the standard yellow time of any intersection that has a red light camera, which has led to an 80% reduction in tickets since its introduction. New Jersey has the strictest yellow timing provisions in the country as a result of concerns that cameras would be used to generate revenue; they have a statute specifying that the yellow time for an intersection that has a red light camera must be based on the speed at which 85% of the road's traffic moves rather than be based on the road's actual speed limit.

== Usage ==
Red light camera usage is widespread in a number of countries worldwide. Netherlands-based Gatso presented red light cameras to the market in 1965, and red light cameras were used for traffic enforcement in Israel as early as 1969. In the early 1970s, red light cameras were used for traffic enforcement in at least one jurisdiction in Europe. Australia began to use them on a wide scale in the 1980s. As of July 21, 2010, expansion of red light camera usage in Australia is ongoing. In some areas of Australia, where the red light cameras are used, there is an online system to check the photograph taken of your vehicle if you receive a ticket. Singapore also began use of red light cameras in the 1980s, and installed the first camera systems during five years, starting in August 1986. In Canada, by 1998, red light cameras were in use in British Columbia and due to be implemented in Manitoba. In Alberta, red light cameras were installed in 1999 in Edmonton and in 2001 in Calgary. The UK first installed cameras in the 1990s, with the earliest locations including eight rail crossings in Scotland where there was greatest demand for enforcement of traffic signals due to fatalities.

=== China ===
==== Mainland China ====
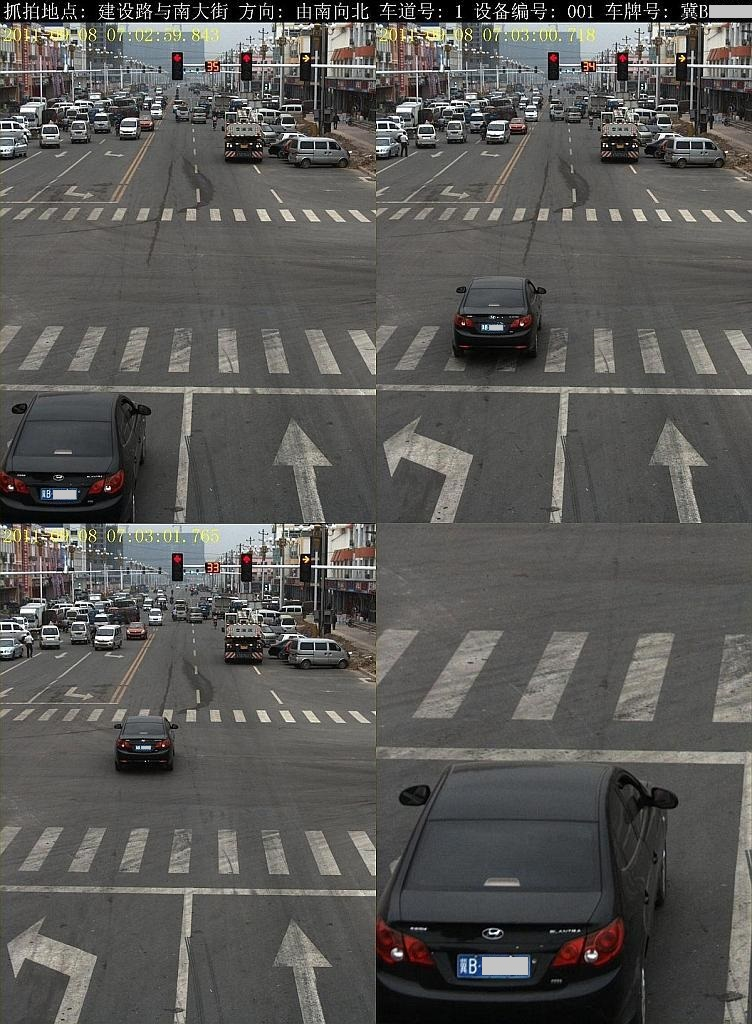
A set of pictures taken by a red light camera in Luannan County, China, the black car in the pictures ran the red light

Red light camera usage is extensive in mainland China. As of 2007, approximately 700 intersections in Shenzhen were monitored for red light violations, speeding, or both.

China also has red light camera with facial recognition. Red light offenders, either pedestrian or motorbikers, are captured by a 7 megapixel camera. Within 20 minutes, a facial recognition system identifies personal information including family name, ID number and address which are displayed in the street on an advertising screen. This information can also be published on social media.

According to the owner, in less than four months, in Lianhua intersection in Shenzhen, jaywalking were reduced from 1000 each day to 80.

==== Hong Kong ====
Hong Kong introduced red light cameras in 1993.

In Hong Kong, where red light cameras are installed, signs are erected to warn drivers that cameras are present, with the aim of educating drivers to stop for signals. The number of red light cameras in Hong Kong doubled in May 2004, and digital red light cameras were introduced at intersections identified by the police and transport department as having the most violations and greatest risk. The digital cameras were introduced to further deter red-light running. As added assistance to drivers, some of the camera posts were painted orange so that drivers could see them more easily. By 2006, Hong Kong had 96 red light cameras in operation. By 2016 this number had risen to 195.

In Hong-Kong, penalty for the failure to comply with traffic signals is a HK$5,000 fine and three months' jail for a first offense. Penalty for other offenses are a HK$10,000 penalty and six-month term.

In Hong-Kong, red light cameras helped reduce violation jumping by 43 to 55%.

=== France ===
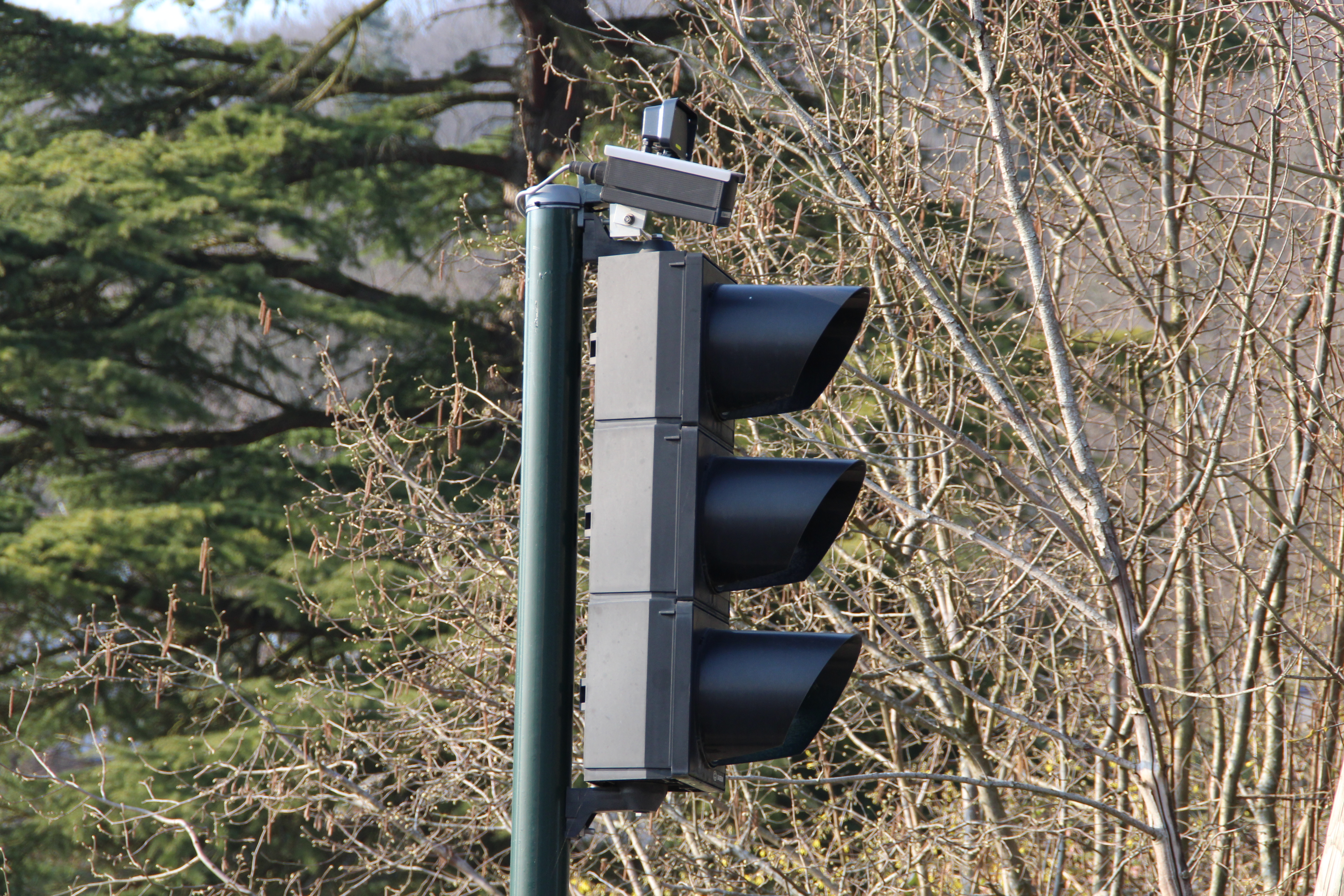
Red light camera experiment in Gif-sur-Yvette

In France, red light cameras started use in 2009. Cameras catch drivers that fail to stop on a red light. A removal of 4 points on the driving licence will occur.

New multipurpose camera might, such as the Mesta Fusion 2 have several simultaneous capacity in a single device, such as red light camera, Level crossing red light camera and speed camera. In a near future the might be able to also catch other infractions such as phone usage, failure to wear the seat belt wearing, or failure to maintain safe distance between vehicle.

Some insurance companies recommend to comply with regulation to avoid the fine. This implies a speed decrease when approaching a red light, considering it can switch to orange and then to red, avoiding acceleration when light is orange, using the brake (which turn on braking light) to communicate to followers the braking action, and keep the car before the red light stop line.

In the south east quarter of France, red light cameras (MESTA 3000) are provided by Safran; their availability rate is 95%, taking into account road works and acts of vandalism. This availability is considered better than the one observed in Great Britain, Spain, the Netherlands, Switzerland and Germany according to a French National Assembly report.

=== Germany ===
The first red light camera in Germany was operated in November 1960 the 15th in Frankfurt am Main with black and white photos.

Red light violations result in a fine of €90, and one penalty point is recorded on the driver's license . If the light has been red for more than one second when the violation occurs, the fine increases to €200, with two penalty points, and the offender's driving license is suspended for one month. In cases of immediate danger, the fine can rise to €320, or to €360 if a crash occurs. A stop line violation incurs a fine of only €10.

If a driver in their probationary period runs a red light and is caught by a red-light camera, they are required to attend a compulsory retraining seminar (Aufbauseminar). Additionally, the probationary period is extended from two to four years.

=== United Kingdom ===
In the United Kingdom the authorities often refer to red-light cameras, along with speed cameras, as safety cameras. They were first used in the early 1990s, with initial deployment by the Department for Environment, Transport and the Regions. All costs were paid by the local authority in which the individual camera was placed, and revenues accrued from fines were paid to the Treasury Consolidated Fund. In 1998 the government handed the powers of collection to local road-safety partnerships, comprising "... local authorities, Magistrates' Courts, the Highways Agency and the police."

In a report, published in December 2005, there were a total of 612 red light cameras in England alone, of which 225 were in London.

In the UK, failure to stop for a red light gives a £100 fine and adds 3 points on the driving license. Some police forces might also register motorists caught running a red light to educational courses.

=== United States ===
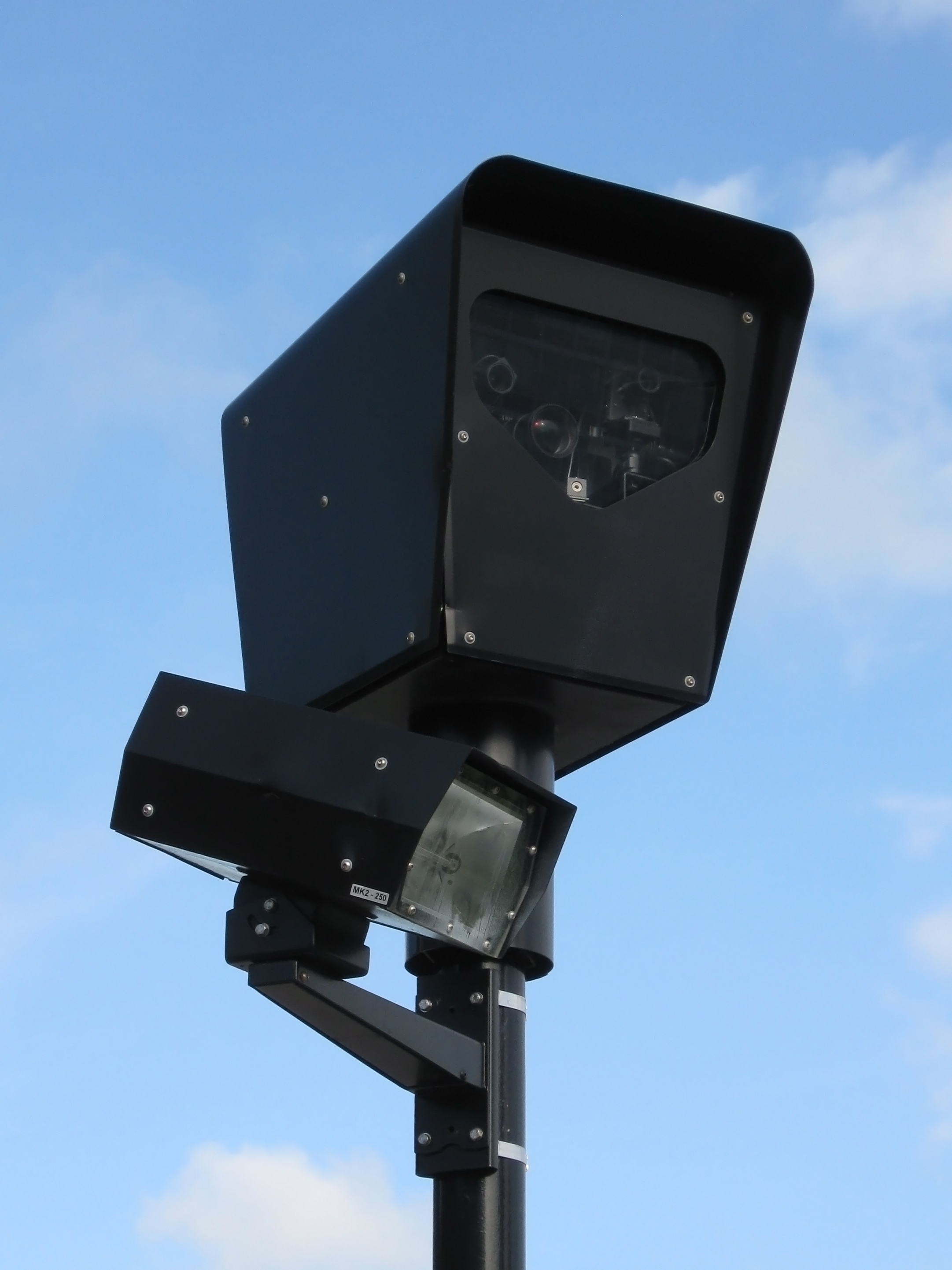
Red light camera in Chicago, Il.

Since the early 1990s, red light cameras have been used in the United States in 26 U.S. states and the District of Columbia. Within some states, the cameras may only be permitted in certain areas. For example, in New York State, the Vehicle and Traffic Law permits red light cameras only within cities with a population above 1 million (i.e. New York City), Rochester, Buffalo, Yonkers, and Nassau and Suffolk Counties. In Florida, a state law went into effect on 1 July 2010, which allows all municipalities in the state to use red light cameras on all state-owned rights-of-way and fine drivers who run red lights, with the aim of enforcing safe driving, according to then-Governor Charlie Crist. The name given to the state law is the Mark Wandall Traffic Safety Act, named for a man who was killed in 2003 by a motorist who ran a red light. In addition to allowing the use of cameras, the law also standardizes driver fines. Major cities throughout the US that use red light cameras include Atlanta, Austin, Baltimore, Baton Rouge, Chicago, Dallas, Denver, Los Angeles, Memphis, New Orleans, New York City, Newark, Philadelphia, Phoenix, Raleigh, San Francisco, Seattle, Toledo, and Washington, D.C. Albuquerque has cameras, but in October 2011 local voters approved a ballot measure advising the city council to cease authorizing the red light camera program. The City of Albuquerque ended its red light program on 31 December 2011.

In March 2017, the city of Chicago changed the period of time between when the light turns red and when the red-light camera is triggered (and a ticket issued) from 0.1 seconds to 0.3 seconds. The "grace period" in Chicago is now in line with other major American cities like New York City and Philadelphia.

Suppliers of red-light cameras in the US include: Affiliated Computer Services (ACS) State and Local Solutions, a Xerox company, of Dallas, Texas; American Traffic Solutions of Scottsdale, Arizona, 1/3 owned by Goldman Sachs; Brekford International Corp., of Hanover, Maryland; CMA Consulting Services, Inc. of Latham, New York; Gatso USA of Beverly, Massachusetts; iTraffic Safety LLC of Ridgeland, South Carolina; NovoaGlobal Inc., of Orlando, Florida; Optotraffic, of Lanham, Maryland; Redflex Traffic Systems of Phoenix, Arizona, with its parent company in Australia; RedSpeed-Illinois LLC, of Lombard, Illinois, whose parent company is in Worcestershire, England; and SafeSpeed LLC, of Chicago, Illinois.

Some states have chosen to prohibit the use of red light cameras. These include Arkansas, Maine, Michigan, Mississippi, Montana, Nebraska, Nevada, New Hampshire, Texas (phasing out fully by 2021), and West Virginia.

In February 2012, the red light camera ordinance in the city of St. Louis was officially declared void by St. Louis Circuit Court Judge Mark Neill. On 9 August 2012, the Cary, North Carolina town council voted to end their program. In February 2013, the San Diego mayor helped remove a red light camera to keep the campaign promise he made during the November 2012 election to eliminate these systems. New Jersey had to renew the Red Light law by the state legislature in early 2015 and did not do this, making the use of red light cameras illegal in the state afterwards.

In the United States, fines are not standardized and vary to a great degree, from $50 in New York City to approximately $500 in California. The cost in California can increase to approximately $600 if the motorist elects to attend traffic school in order to avoid having a demerit point added to his or her driving record.

People killed at red light in the United States. Source: IIHS. View chart definition.

==== Notice of traffic violation ====
In many California police departments, when a positive identification cannot be made, the registered owner of the vehicle will be mailed a notice of traffic violation instead of a real ticket. Also known as "snitch tickets," these notices are used to request identifying information about the driver of the vehicle during the alleged violation. Because these notices have not been filed at court, they carry no legal weight and the registered owner is under no obligation to respond. In California, a genuine ticket will bear the name and address of the local branch of the Superior Court and direct the recipient to contact that court. In contrast, a notice of traffic violation generated by the police will omit court information, using statements like "This is not a notice to appear" and "Do not forward this information to the Court."

In September 2014, a bill was proposed in New Jersey to disallow the state Motor Vehicle Commission from sharing license plate and driver information needed to cite New Jersey drivers accused of committing infractions in another state.

==== Decrease since 2012 in the United States ====
While the number of red light cameras decreased from 533 in 2012 to 421 in 2018, people killed in red-light crashes increased from 696 in 2012 to 811 in 2016, reflecting a 17% increase.

The reasons for the red light camera discontinuation were reduction in camera citations, difficulty sustaining the financial viability of the program and intense community opposition.

In the United States, surveys indicate the public support for red light camera enforcement; however, the support is decreasing if programs are not adequate, or if perception is focused on revenue rather than on saving lives. To be successful, a red light camera should focus on safety and transparency, as well as be located in a problematic intersection which needs to be assessed by communities (for instance, for road design and signal timing). It could also take into account public input with stakeholders such as law enforcement, victim advocates, school officials and residents to plan a program.

Red light camera deployment in US, source IIHS. View chart definition.

=== Singapore ===
In 2014 Singapore started to use German Jenoptik red light cameras, with an 11-megapixel resolution. 240 streets have red light cameras in Singapore.

=== Australia (New South Wales) ===
In New South Wales red light cameras were introduced in April 1982 followed by speed cameras in 2009.

In New South Wales there are 191 cameras at 171 intersections. These camera can check both the red light and the speed

During the period of observations were:

- 33% reduction in fatal and serious injury crashes
- 54% reduction in fatalities
- 35% reduction in serious injuries
- 49% reduction in pedestrian casualties.

== Studies and politics ==
A report in 2003 by the National Cooperative Highway Research Program examined studies from the previous 30 years in Australia, the UK, Singapore, and the US, and concluded that red light cameras "improve the overall safety of intersections where they are used." While the report states that evidence is not conclusive (partly due to flaws in the studies), the majority of studies show a reduction in angle crashes, a smaller increase in rear-end crashes, with some evidence of a "spillover" effect of reduced red light running to other intersections within a jurisdiction. These findings are similar to a 2005 meta analysis, which compared the results of 10 controlled before-after studies of red light cameras in the US, Australia, and Singapore. The analysis stated that the studies showed a reduction in crashes (up to almost 30%) in which there were injuries; however, evidence was less conclusive for a reduction in total collisions. Studies of red light cameras worldwide show a reduction of crashes involving injury by about 25% to 30%, taking into account increases in rear-end crashes, according to testimony from a meeting of the Virginia House of Delegates Militia, Police, and Public Safety Committee in 2003. These findings are supported by a review of more than 45 international studies carried out in 2010, which found that red light cameras reduce red light violation rates, crashes resulting from red light running, and usually reduce right-angle collisions.

Amongst the many researched safety benefits of installing RLCs, few studies have examined drivers' behavior change in relation to red-light cameras showing that at these intersections drivers tended to react quicker to a yellow light change when stopping. The consequence of this change could be the slight decline in the intersection capacity. In terms of location-specific studies, in Singapore a study from 2003 found that there was "a substantial drop" in red light violations at intersections with red light cameras. In particular the study found that drivers were encouraged to stop more readily in areas with red light cameras in use. A report from civic administrators in Saskatchewan in 2001, when considering red light camera use, referred to studies in the Netherlands and Australia that found a 40% decrease in red light violations and 32% decrease in right-angle crashes where red light cameras were installed. Following the introduction of red light cameras in Western Australia, the number of serious right-angle crashes decreased by 40%, according to an article from the Canberra Times. In an article from the Xinhua General News Service, the Hong Kong transport department reported that in 2006 the monthly average number of crashes due to red light violations fell 25% and the number of people injured in these crashes decreased by 30%, following an increase in the number of red light cameras in use.

=== North America ===
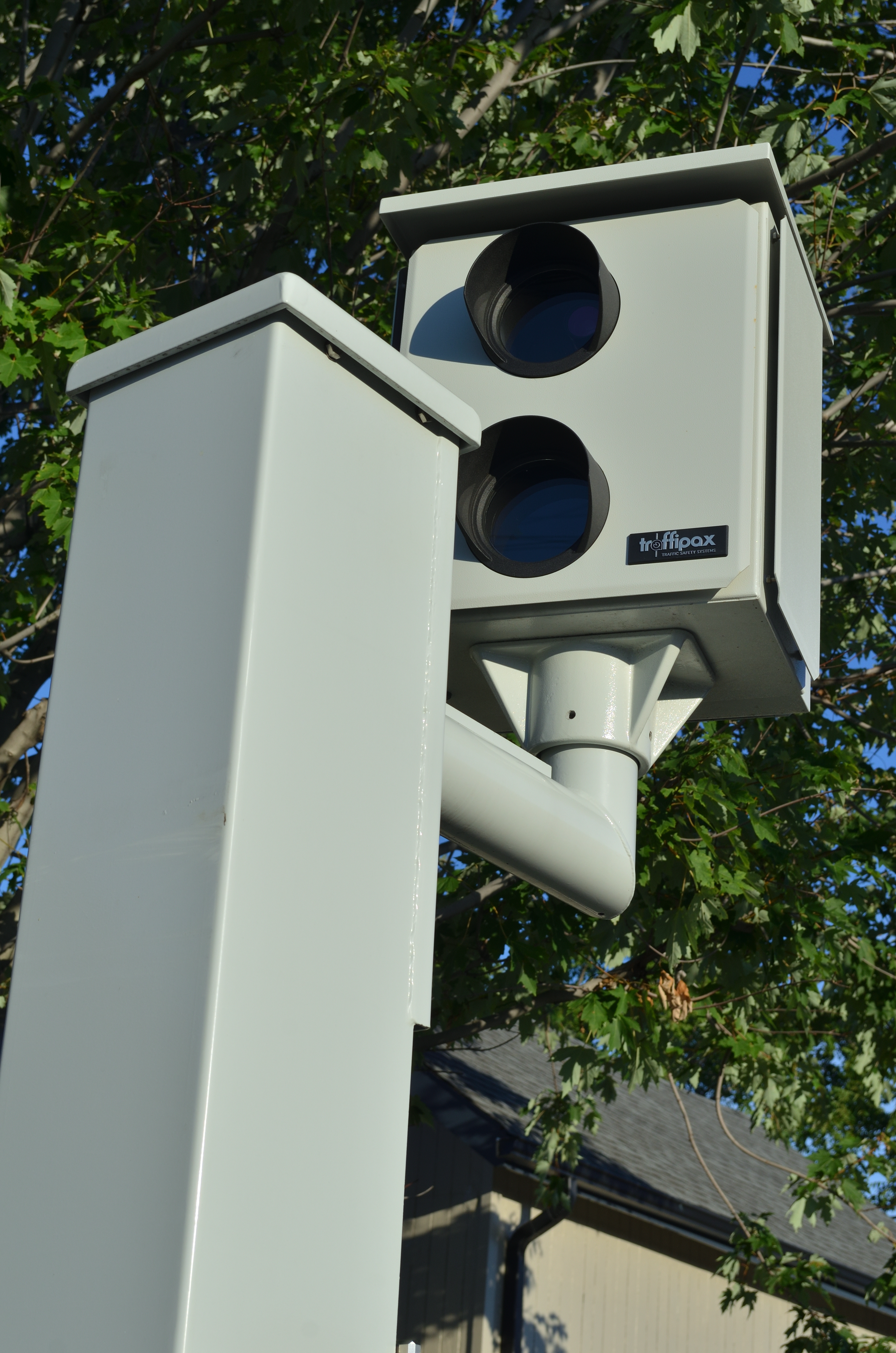
Red light camera in Ontario, Canada

In the U.S. and Canada, a number of studies have examined whether red light cameras produce a safety benefit. A 2005 study by the U.S. Federal Highway Administration (FHWA) suggests red light cameras reduce dangerous right-angle crashes. The FHWA study has been criticized as containing critical methodological and analytical flaws and failing to explain an increase in fatalities associated with red light camera use:

(...)the authors spotlight the statistical difficulties of including the cost of fatalities, while ignoring the practical implications of such events (...) assuming that each angle injury crash had a societal cost of $64,468, when in fact the cost was $82,816 before camera use and $100,176 after camera use(...)

Not all studies have been favorable to the use of red light cameras. A 2004 study of 17,271 crashes from North Carolina A & T University showed that the presence of red light cameras increased the overall number of crashes by 40%. This research received no peer review and is considered flawed by the IIHS. A 2005 Virginia Department of Transportation study of the long-term effects of camera enforcement in the state found a decrease in the number of right-angle crashes with injuries, but an increase in rear-end crashes and an overall increase in the number of crashes causing injuries. In 2007, the department issued an updated report which showed that the overall number of crashes at intersections with red light cameras increased. This report concluded that the decision to install red light cameras should be made on an intersection-by-intersection basis as some intersections saw decreases in crashes and injuries that justified the use of red light cameras, while others saw increases in crashes, indicating that the cameras were not suitable in that location. This study, too, is considered flawed by the IIHS. Aurora, Colorado experienced mixed results with red light cameras; after starting camera enforcement at 4 intersections, crashes decreased by 60% at one, increased 100% at two, and increased 175% at the fourth. According to the IIHS, most studies suggest the increase in rear-end collisions decreases once drivers have become accustomed to the new dynamics of the intersection. Some locations experience a decrease in rear-end collisions at intersections with red light cameras over time, for instance, in Los Angeles such collisions fell 4.7% from 2008 to 2009. However, a 2010 analysis by the Los Angeles City Controller found L.A.'s red light cameras had not demonstrated an improvement in safety, specifically that of the 32 intersections equipped with cameras, 12 saw more crashes than before the cameras were installed, 4 had the same number, and 16 had fewer crashes; also that factors other than the cameras may have been responsible for the reduced crashes at the 16 intersections. And in Winnipeg, Manitoba, crashes were found to have significantly increased in the years following the deployment of red light cameras. In 2010, Arizona completed a study of their statewide 76 photo enforcement cameras and decided they would not renew the program in 2011; lower revenue than expected, mixed public acceptance and mixed accident data were cited.

Nevertheless, the FHWA has concluded that the cameras yielded a positive overall cost benefit due to the reduction in more expensive right-angle injury collisions. Other studies have found a greater crash reduction. For example, a 2005 study of the Raleigh, North Carolina, red light camera program conducted by the Institute for Transportation Research and Education at North Carolina State University found right-angle crashes dropped by 42%, rear-end crashes dropped by 25% and total crashes dropped by 17%. In 2010, the IIHS looked at results of a number of studies and found that red light cameras reduce total collisions and particularly reduce the type of crashes that are especially likely to cause injuries. A 2011 IIHS report concluded that the rate of fatal collisions involving red-light running in cities with a population of 200,000 or greater was 24% lower with cameras than it would have been without cameras.

== Opinions ==
=== United States ===
A 2009 Public Opinion Strategies poll which asked, "Do you support or oppose the use of red-light cameras to detect red-light runners and enforce traffic laws in your state's most dangerous intersections?" found 69% support and 29% oppose. A 2012 telephone survey of District of Columbia residents published in the journal Traffic Injury Prevention found that 87% favored red light cameras.

The National Motorists Association opposes red light cameras on the grounds that the use of these devices raises legal issues and violates the privacy of citizens. They also argue that the use of red light cameras does not increase safety. In the US, AAA Auto Club South argued against the passage of a Florida state law to allow red light cameras, stating that use of red light cameras was primarily for raising money for the state and local government coffers and would not increase road safety. Worse, there are allegations of corruption in shortening the amber to increase the number of tickets. The construction of speed breakers or road bumps were conventional methods of forcing motorists to lower speeds, but were dropped at locales in favor of cameras due to lobbying efforts.

=== Canada and Europe ===
In Norway, Spain, and the Netherlands, a postal survey in 2003 showed acceptance of the use of red light cameras for traffic enforcement. For some groups, the enforcement of traffic laws is considered the main reason for using the red light cameras. For example, a report from civic administrators in Saskatoon, Saskatchewan, Canada in 2001 described the cameras as "simply an enforcement tool used to penalize motorists that fail to stop for red traffic signals."

== Controversy ==
=== United States ===
As of December 2016 Arizona, Arkansas, Louisiana, Maine, Mississippi, Montana, Nebraska, Nevada, New Jersey, South Carolina, South Dakota, Utah, West Virginia, and Wisconsin have enacted various prohibitions on red light, speed or other photo enforcement camera uses. Texas banned the use of red cameras in 2019. Restrictions or conditions exist in additional states; the New Mexico Department of Transportation, for example, has asserted the right to restrict or prohibit red light cameras on state highways. While red light cameras may not be prohibited in other regions, they may have some restrictions on their use. In some jurisdictions, the law says that the camera needs to obtain a photo of the driver's face in order for the citation issued for running the red light to be valid. This is the case in California and Colorado where the red light cameras are set up to take a series of photographs, including one of the driver's face. In California, state law assesses a demerit point against a driver who runs a red light, and the need to identify the actual violator has led to the creation of a unique investigatory tool, the fake "ticket." Groups opposing the use of red light cameras have argued that where the cameras are not set up to identify the vehicle driver, owner liability issues are raised. It is perceived by some that the owner of the vehicle is unfairly penalized by being considered liable for red-light violations although they may not have been the driver at the time of the offense. In most jurisdictions the liability for red light violations is a civil offense, rather than a criminal citation, issued upon the vehicle owner—similar to a parking ticket. The issue of owner liability has been addressed in the US courts, with a ruling in the District of Columbia Court of Appeals in 2007, which agreed with a lower court when it found that the presumption of liability of the owners of vehicles issued citations does not violate due process rights. This ruling was supported by a 2009 7th US Circuit Court of Appeals ruling in which it was held that issuing citations to vehicle owners (or lessees) is constitutional. The court stated that it also encourages drivers to be cautious in lending their vehicles to others.

The argument that red light cameras violate the privacy of citizens, has also been addressed in the US courts. According to a 2009 ruling by the 7th US Circuit Court of Appeals, "no one has a fundamental right to run a red light or avoid being seen by a camera on a public street." In addition, cameras only take photographs or video when a vehicle has run a red light and, in most states, the camera does not photograph the driver or the occupants of the vehicle. It is also argued that such cameras violate the Sixth Amendment's Confrontation Clause and the right to be assumed innocent until proven guilty.

In most areas, red light enforcement cameras are installed and maintained by private firms. Lawsuits have been raised challenging private companies' rights to hand out citations, such as a December 2008 lawsuit challenging the city of Dallas' red light camera program, which was dismissed in March 2009. In most cases, citations are issued by law enforcement officers using the evidence provided by the companies.

There have been many instances where cities in the US have been found to have too-short yellow-light intervals at some intersections where red light cameras have been installed. In Tennessee, 176 drivers were refunded for fines paid after it was discovered that the length of the yellow was too short for that location, and motorists were caught running the light in the first second of the red phase. In California, a combined total of 7,603 tickets were refunded or dismissed by the cities of Bakersfield, Costa Mesa, East LA, San Carlos, and Union City, because of too-short yellows. Although national guidelines addressing the length of traffic signals are available, traffic signal phase times are determined by the government employees of the city, county or state for that signalized location. While some states set jurisdiction-wide constant durations for yellow-light intervals, a new standard is taking hold. States are required to adopt the 2009 National Manual on Uniform Traffic Control Devices (MUTCD) as their legal state standard for traffic-control devices since 2011. These standards require engineering practices to be used to set yellow-light-timing durations at individual intersections and or corridors. For guidance to state authorities, MUTCD states yellow lights should have a minimum duration of 3 seconds and a maximum duration of 6 seconds. The deadline for compliance is 2014. In the US, if any part of a driver's vehicle has already passed into the intersection when the signal turns red, a violation is not generated. A ticket is only issued if the vehicle enters the intersection while the light is red.

In 2014, a bill was introduced in the United States House of Representatives attempting to prohibit red light cameras on federally funded highways and in the District of Columbia.

=== Canada ===
In 2019, Ottawa, the capital of Canada, pledged a Road Safety Reserve Fund that would use revenue generated from red light camera tickets to further improve road safety, however a 2025 audit report revealed that none of the $41 million in red light camera tickets generated between 2021 to 2024 was transferred to the fund.

=== Italy ===
In 2010, it was revealed that the municipality of Segrate, Italy, two nearby traffic lights had been synchronized such that drivers were coerced to either break the speed limit or pass during the red light. This was investigated as a deliberate fraud to increase the income from tickets. It took months before the machines were eventually dismantled by the Guardia di Finanza.

== Alternatives ==
A red light camera is not the only countermeasure against red-light running. Others include increasing the visibility distance and conspicuity of the traffic light so it is more likely to attract the driver's attention in time for the driver to stop, re-timing lights so drivers will encounter fewer red ones, increasing the duration of the yellow light between the green and the red, adding a "clearance" phase to the intersection's traffic signals, during which all directions have a red light. It has been posited that the regulatory minimum yellow duration has been decreased over the years, that this is a cause of the increase in red-light running, and that the latter countermeasures amount to a reversion to earlier, longer regulated yellow-light durations.

== See also ==
- Speed bump (Sleeping policeman)
- Divided highway
