= Accident Analysis & Prevention =

- Discipline: Accident prevention
- Language: English

Publication details
- History: 1969-present
- Publisher: Elsevier on behalf of the Association for the Advancement of Automotive Medicine
- Frequency: Bimonthly
- Impact factor: 4.993 (2020)

Standard abbreviations
- ISO 4: Accid. Anal. Prev.

Indexing
- ISSN: 0001-4575

Links
- Journal homepage

Accident Analysis & Prevention is a bimonthly peer-reviewed public health journal covering accident prevention published by Elsevier on behalf of the Association for the Advancement of Automotive Medicine.

The journal was established in 1969 by Frank Haight (University of California, Irvine). Haight served as editor-in-chief until 2004 when Karl Kim and Rune Elvik became co-editors-in-chief. In 2013, Mohamed Abdel-Aty (University of Central Florida) took over until the end of 2020. He was succeeded in January 2021 by Helai Huang (Central South University).

According to the Journal Citation Reports, the journal has a 2020 impact factor of 4.993.
