= Traumatology (journal) =

- Discipline: Traumatology
- Language: English
- Edited by: Regardt Ferreira

Publication details
- History: 1995-current
- Publisher: American Psychological Association
- Frequency: Quarterly

Standard abbreviations
- ISO 4: Traumatology

Indexing
- ISSN: 1085-9373

Links
- Journal homepage; Online access; Online archive

Traumatology is a quarterly peer-reviewed medical journal that covers research in the field of traumatology. The editor-in-chief is Regardt J. Ferreira PhD. It was established in 1995 and was published by SAGE Publications until December 2013. The American Psychological Association now publishes the journal.

== Abstracting and indexing ==
The journal is abstracted and indexed in PILOTS, PsycINFO, and SafetyLit.
