= Haddon Matrix =

Paradigm for injury prevention

The Haddon Matrix is the most commonly used paradigm in the injury prevention field.

Developed by William Haddon in 1970, the matrix looks at factors related to personal attributes, vector or agent attributes and environmental attributes; before, during and after an injury or death. By utilizing this framework, one can then think about evaluating the relative importance of different factors and design interventions.

A typical Haddon Matrix:

Phase	Human Factors	Vehicles and Equipment Factors	Environmental Factors
Pre-crash	Information; Attitudes; Impairment; Police Enforcement	Road Worthiness; Lighting; Braking; Speed Management	Road design and road layout; Speed limits; Pedestrian facilities
Crash	Use of restraints; Impairments	Occupant restraints; Other safety devices; Crash-protective design	Crash-protective roadside objects
Post-Crash	First-aid skills; Access to medics	Ease of access; Fire risk	Rescue facilities; Congestion

== Preventing injuries ==
(These ten items are often called "Haddon's Strategies.") Possible ways of preventing injury during the various phases include:

=== Pre-event ===
1. Prevent the existence of the agent.
2. Prevent the release of the agent.
3. Separate the agent from the host.
4. Provide protection for the host.

=== Event ===
1. Minimize the amount of agent present.
2. Control the pattern of release of the agent to minimize damage.
3. Control the interaction between the agent and host to minimize damage.
4. Increase the resilience of the host.

=== Post-event ===
1. Provide a rapid treatment response for host.
2. Provide treatment and rehabilitation for the host.

== General and cited references ==
- Runyan CW (December 1998). "Using the Haddon matrix: introducing the third dimension". Inj. Prev. 4 (4): 302–7. doi:10.1136/ip.4.4.302. PMC 1730420. PMID 9887425.
- https://web.archive.org/web/20070927192751/http://www.dph.sf.ca.us/CHPP/CAM/4-PublHlthApproach/HaddonMatrix.pdf
- http://www.ibiblio.org/vincentweb/chapter6.html
- Barnett DJ, Balicer RD, Blodgett D, Fews AL, Parker CL, Links JM (May 2005). "The Application of the Haddon Matrix to Public Health Readiness and Response Planning". Environ. Health Perspect. 113 (5): 561–6. doi:10.1289/ehp.7491. PMC 1257548. PMID 15866764.
