= Functional Capacity Index =

- Purpose: measure of function after trauma

The Functional Capacity Index (FCI) is a measure of a person's level of function for the following 12 months after sustaining some form of illness or injury. The FCI incorporates ten physical functions and gives each a numerical value on a scale of 0 to 100, with 100 representing no limitations on a person's everyday function.

== See also ==
- Abbreviated injury scale
