= Injury Severity Score =

Medical score to assess trauma severity

The Injury Severity Score (ISS) is an established medical score to assess trauma severity. It correlates with mortality, morbidity and hospitalization time after trauma. It is used to define the term major trauma. A major trauma (or polytrauma) is defined as the Injury Severity Score being greater than 15. The AIS Committee of the Association for the Advancement of Automotive Medicine (AAAM) designed and improves upon the scale.

== Abbreviated Injury Scale (AIS) ==
The Abbreviated Injury Scale (AIS) is an anatomically based consensus-derived global severity scoring system that classifies each injury in every body region according to its relative severity on a six-point ordinal scale:

1. Minor
2. Moderate
3. Serious
4. Severe
5. Critical
6. Maximal (currently untreatable).

There are nine AIS chapters corresponding to nine body regions:

1. Head
2. Face
3. Neck
4. Thorax
5. Abdomen
6. Spine
7. Upper Extremity
8. Lower Extremity
9. External and other.

== Definition ==
The ISS is based (see below) upon the Abbreviated Injury Scale (AIS). To calculate an ISS for an injured person, the body is divided into six ISS body regions. These body regions are:

- Head or neck – including cervical spine
- Face – including the facial skeleton, nose, mouth, eyes and ears
- Chest – thoracic spine and diaphragm
- Abdomen or pelvic contents – abdominal organs and lumbar spine
- Extremities or pelvic girdle – pelvic skeleton
- External

To calculate an ISS, take the highest AIS severity code in each of the three most severely injured ISS body regions, square each AIS code and add the three squared numbers for an ISS (ISS = A^{2} + B^{2} + C^{2} where A, B, C are the AIS scores of the three most injured ISS body regions). The ISS scores ranges from 1 to 75 (i.e. AIS scores of 5 for each category). If any of the three scores is a 6, the score is automatically set at 75. Since a score of 6 ("unsurvivable") indicates the futility of further medical care in preserving life, this may mean a cessation of further care in triage for a patient with a score of 6 in any category.
