= Abbreviated Injury Scale =

Anatomical-based coding system

- Purpose: Classify and describe the severity of injuries.
- Test of: Threat to life

The Abbreviated Injury Scale (AIS) is an anatomical-based coding system created by the Association for the Advancement of Automotive Medicine to classify and describe the severity of injuries. It represents the threat to life associated with the injury rather than the comprehensive assessment of the severity of the injury. AIS is one of the most common anatomic scales for traumatic injuries.

== History ==
The first version of the scale was published in 1969 with major updates in 1976, 1980, 1985, 1990, 1998, 2005, 2008 and 2015.

== Scale ==
The score describes three aspects of the injury using seven numbers written as 12(34)(56).7

- Type
- Location
- Severity

Each number signifies

- 1- body region
- 2- type of anatomical structure
- 3,4- specific anatomical structure
- 5,6- level
- 7- Severity of score

1. Body region
AIS Code	Region
1	Head
2	Face
3	Neck
4	Thorax
5	Abdomen
6	Spine
7	Upper Extremity
8	Lower Extremity
9	Unspecified

2. Type of Anatomic Structure
AIS Code	Region
1	Whole Area
2	Vessels
3	Nerves
4	Organs (inc. muscles/ligaments)
5	Skeletal (inc. joints)
6	Loss of Consciousness (head only)

3/4 Specific Anatomic Structure
Whole Area
AIS Code	Region
02	Skin Abrasion
04	Contusion
06	Laceration
08	Avulsion
10	Amputation
20	Burn
30	Crush
40	Degloving
50	Injury - NFS
60	Penetrating
Head - Loss of Consciousness (LOC)
02	Length of loss of consciousness
04-08	Level of consciousness
10	Concussion
Spine
02	Cervical
04	Thoracic
06	Lumbar
Vessels, Nerves, Organs, Bones, Joints
02	Vessels
04	Nerves
06	Organs
08	Bones
10	Joints

5/6 Level
Specific Injuries are assigned consecutive two-digit numbers beginning with 02

Fractures, rupture, laceration, etc.

=== Severity ===
Abbreviated Injury Score-Code is on a scale of one to six, one being a minor injury and six being maximal (currently untreatable). An AIS-Code of 6 is not the arbitrary code for a deceased patient or fatal injury, but the code for injuries specifically assigned an AIS 6 severity. An AIS-Code of 9 is used to describe injuries for which not enough information is available for more detailed coding, e.g. crush injury to the head.

The AIS scale is a measurement tool for single injuries. A universally accepted injury aggregation function has not yet been proposed, though the injury severity score and its derivatives are better aggregators for use in clinical settings. In other settings such as automotive design and occupant protection, MAIS is a useful tool for the comparison of specific injuries and their relative severity and the changes in those frequencies that may result from evolving motor vehicle design.

Abbreviated injury Score
AIS-Code	Injury	Example	AIS % prob. of death
1	Minor	superficial laceration	0.1-1
2	Moderate	fractured sternum	1-2
3	Serious	open fracture of humerus	2-16
4	Severe	perforated trachea	16-30
5	Critical	ruptured liver with tissue loss	30-99
6	Fatal	total severance of aorta	100
9	Not further specified (NFS)		

== Usage in the European Union ==
The European Union defined the MAIS3+ as the maximum abbreviated injury scale (MAIS) with a score of 3 or more. The definition was used to harmonize count of serious injuries or serious road injury in different member States (see Killed or Seriously Injured). Since 2017 Valletta Council conclusions on road safety, States started collecting those numbers. This need use of hospital data rather than police data.

Patients often have more than one injury. The Maximum Abbreviated Injury Score (MAIS) is the highest AIS score of all injuries of a person. A road casualty with a MAIS score of 3 or more is referred to as MAIS3+

— European Road Safety Observatory.

Those data can be computed in three different ways:

1. with a link between police and hospital data;
2. reporting injuries from hospitals;
3. using police data with a corrective coefficient computed from samples

Previously each State had a different definition of a serious injury.

It has been estimated that 110,000 people were seriously injured in traffic collisions on the roads of European Union member States in 2019, based on MAIS3+ definition. In 2018, some Eastern European countries do not provide data. When data is available, the breakdown attributes 19 thousandths to Italy, 16 to France, 15 to Germany, 7 to the Netherlands, 5 to Spain, 3 to Belgium, 3 to Czechia, 2 to Portugal, 1 to Austria, and less than one thousands for each other countries. However, these data are computed with different methods in each country. One reason is that medical diagnoses are often coded with the WHO’s International Classification of Diseases (ICD). Also, Italy uses ICD-9 and other countries use ICD-10.

== See also ==
- Functional capacity index
- Injury severity score
