= Kermanshah University of Medical Sciences =

Educational institution in Iran

- دانشگاه علوم پزشکی و خدمات بهداشتی درمانی کرمانشاه; Danushgah-e 'lum-e Pezeshki-ye vâ Xedâmat-e Behedashti-ye Dârmati-ye Kârmanshah
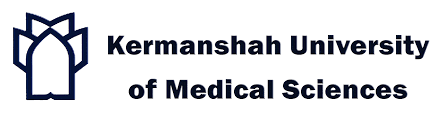
- Type: Public
- Established: 1968
- Chancellor: Ali Soroush, M.D., Ph.D.
- Academic staff: 542
- Students: 5500
- Location: Kermanshah, Kermanshah province, Iran; 35.7483°N 51.3812°E
- Campus: Urban
- Colors: Turquoise and Orange
- Nickname: Kums
- Website: www.kums.ac.ir/en/home

Kermanshah University of Medical Sciences

KUMS general information:

- Established in 1968
- Developed into the Medical University in 1985
- Number of Vice Chancellors: 7
- Number of Faculties: 9
- Number of IPD Hospitals and Clinics: 10
- Number of Research Centers: 13
- Academic Journals: 6
- Published Articles: 11304
- H-index: 128
- Number of Academic Staff: 542
- Number of Students: 5491
- Fields of Study: 104

Kermanshah University of Medical Sciences is a medical university in Kermanshah, Iran. was inaugurated as the Nursing High School in 1968, and became a medical college in 1975. After the Islamic revolution, it was further developed into the Medical University in 1985. The university has 521 academic staff and 5500 students studying at all levels of medical fields at its faculties, and doing their practical training and placement in Teaching Hospitals, and prepare them for the job market. The university regulates and coordinates the activities of medical education, training and research in healthcare profession throughout Kermanshah province. In addition to teaching and treatment, it has also been dealing with such areas as research and innovations in order to improve allied health sciences. Among the research activities, the university mainly focuses on higher research programs in Basic Medical Sciences, Allied Health Sciences and Nursing. This university has eight Vice-Chancellors, eight faculties, and seventeen Hospitals. eight of these Hospitals are in Kermanshah city, and the others are located in its towns as follows: Islam Abad, Paveh, Javanroud, Sarpole' Zohab, Sonqor, Sahneh, Qasre-Shirin, Kangavar, Gilan Qarb and Harsin.

== Collaborating schools ==
Collaborating schools
Country	University
Iraq	University of Sulaymanyah
Iraq	Hawler Medical University
Netherlands	Academic Medical Center at the University of Amsterdam
Iraq	University of Garmian
Netherlands	Maastricht University
Iraq	University of Human Development Sulaymanyah
Iraq	Wasit University

== Adjunct and Visiting Professors ==
The Adjunct and Visiting Professors below collaborate with KUMS:

Adjunct Professors	Visiting Professors
Khosrow Adeli, PhD/University of Toronto	Juan Francisco Asenjo, MD/McGill University
Mohammad Abdoli-Ermaki, PhD/Ryerson University	Serge Brand, PhD/Basel University
Farahnak Assadi, MD/Chicago University	Walter Klimscha, MD/Vienna University
Ali Asgari, PhD/Toronto University	Christopher Franco, PhD/Flinders University
Shahrzad Bazargan-Hejazi, PhD/UCLA University	Michael Nelson, PhD/King's College London
Bijan Bijan, MD/University of California	
Elaheh Mahdavian, PhD/Louisiana State University Shreveport	
Mohammad Amin Mohammadifar, PhD/Thecnical University of Denmark	
Ramin Pakbaz, MD/Scripps Memorial Hospital La Jolla (CA)	
Amir Sharafkhaneh, MD, PhD/Baylor College of Medicine	
Ziaeddin Shariat-Madar, PhD/University of Messissippi	
Hojatollah Vali, PhD/McGill University	

== Rankings ==
According to the latest Academic Ranking of World Universities that released by Shanghai Ranking of Academic Subject 2019, Kermanshah University of Medical Sciences ranks between 201 and 300 among the top universities in the world based on Clinical Medicine.

== Faculties ==
=== Faculty of Medicine ===
Faculty of Medicine was founded in 1975. Currently, 192 medical students are studying at this faculty, and over 3878 medical students have graduated so far.

=== Educational Status ===
Currently, there are eleven basic sciences department, eight departments in master programs, two departments in PhD programs, and twenty two clinical departments at the faculty of medicine.

Table 1: Academic Staff of the Faculty of Medicine According to Academic Level and Ranking
Academic Staff	Number
Basic Sciences	87
Clinical	206
Professor	17
Associate Professor	79
Assistant Professor	193
Instructor	3
Total	293

=== Departments ===
There are over 35 clinical and basic sciences departments and programs in the faculty of medicine, which are summarized in Table 2.

Table 2. The Departments in the Faculty of Medicine
Anatomy	Medical Physics
Anesthesiology	Microbiology
Clinical Biochemistry	Mycology & Parasitology
Biomedical Engineering	Neurology
Cardiology	Neurosurgery
Clinical Psychology	Obstetrics & Gynecology
Dermatology	Ophthalmology
Emergency Medicine	Orthopedics
Languages & Literature	Pathology
E.N.T	Pediatrics
General Surgery	Psychiatry
Health & Social Medicine	Physiology – Pharmacology
Immunology	Radiology
Infectious Disease	Radiotherapy & Oncology
Internal Medicine	Sports Medicine & Rehabilitation
Islamic Education	Alternative & Complementary Medicine
Medical Biotechnology	Urology

=== Background ===
Established in 2008, the faculty started admitting students in general dentistry in 2009.

=== Educational status ===
The Faculty of Dentistry has 46 academic staff, working in 10 departments in which they have trained 417 students including six international residency students. The table below summarizes the academic staff of the faculty based on their specialties.

Table 1. Academic staff of the Faculty of Dentistry by specialty
Specialty	Number
Endodontics	4
Orthodontics	6
Oral and maxillofacial medicine	5
Periodontics	6
Dental prostheses	4
Restorative dentistry	4
Oral and maxillofacial surgery	5
Oral and maxillofacial radiology	5
Pediatric dentistry	5
Research Center of Dentistry	2
Total	46
