= Journal of Safety Research =

- Discipline: Safety, occupational health
- Language: English
- Edited by: Thomas Planek

Publication details
- History: 1969-present
- Publisher: Jointly published by Elsevier and the National Safety Council
- Frequency: Quarterly
- Impact factor: 1.870 (2014)

Standard abbreviations
- ISO 4: J. Saf. Res.

Indexing
- CODEN: JSFRAV
- ISSN: 0022-4375 (print); 1879-1247 (web)

Links
- Journal homepage; Online access

The Journal of Safety Research is a quarterly peer-reviewed academic journal covering all aspects of safety and health research. It was established in 1969 and is published jointly by Elsevier and the National Safety Council. The editor-in-chief is Thomas Planek (National Safety Council). According to the Journal Citation Reports, the journal has a 2014 impact factor of 1.870.
