= Traffic Injury Prevention =

- Discipline: Emergency medicine, public health
- Language: English
- Edited by: David C. Viano

Publication details
- Former names: Journal of Crash Prevention and Injury Control
- History: 1999-present
- Publisher: Taylor & Francis
- Frequency: Bimonthly
- Impact factor: 1.413 (2014)

Standard abbreviations
- ISO 4: Traffic Inj. Prev.

Indexing
- ISSN: 1538-9588 (print); 1538-957X (web)

Links
- Journal homepage; Online access

Traffic Injury Prevention is a bimonthly peer-reviewed academic journal covering the prevention of injuries resulting from traffic accidents. It was established in 1999 as the Journal of Crash Prevention and Injury Control, obtaining its current name in 2002. It is the official journal of the Association for the Advancement of Automotive Medicine, the International Traffic Medicine Association, the International Research Council on the Biomechanics of Impact, and the International Council on Alcohol Drugs and Traffic Safety. The editor-in-chief is David C. Viano (ProBiomechanics LLC). According to the Journal Citation Reports, the journal has a 2014 impact factor of 1.413, ranking it 95th out of 162 journals in the category "Public, Environmental & Occupational Health".
