= Association for the Advancement of Automotive Medicine =

The Association for the Advancement of Automotive Medicine (AAAM) is a non-profit education and research organization founded in 1957 by the Medical Advisory committee to the Sports Car Club of America. It is the first and premier professional multidisciplinary organization dedicated entirely to the prevention and control of injuries from motor vehicle crashes.

AAAM is an international association with professionals representing more than 20 countries committed to reducing motor vehicle trauma and improving highway safety around the world. Its strength lies in its membership representing medicine, engineering, biomechanics, law, education, and public policy. This combination of clinical, research and administrative backgrounds forms a unique blend of leaders in traffic injury control and it is these professionals who comprise the AAAM membership.

The AAAM has furthered the development and publishes the Abbreviated Injury Scale (AIS), a widely used description system for individual injuries. The Abbreviated Injury Scale is an internationally accepted tool for assessing the injury severity of individual injuries. It contains no information on injury aggregation. The AIS codebook is protected by copyright.
