= Penetrating trauma =

Type of injury

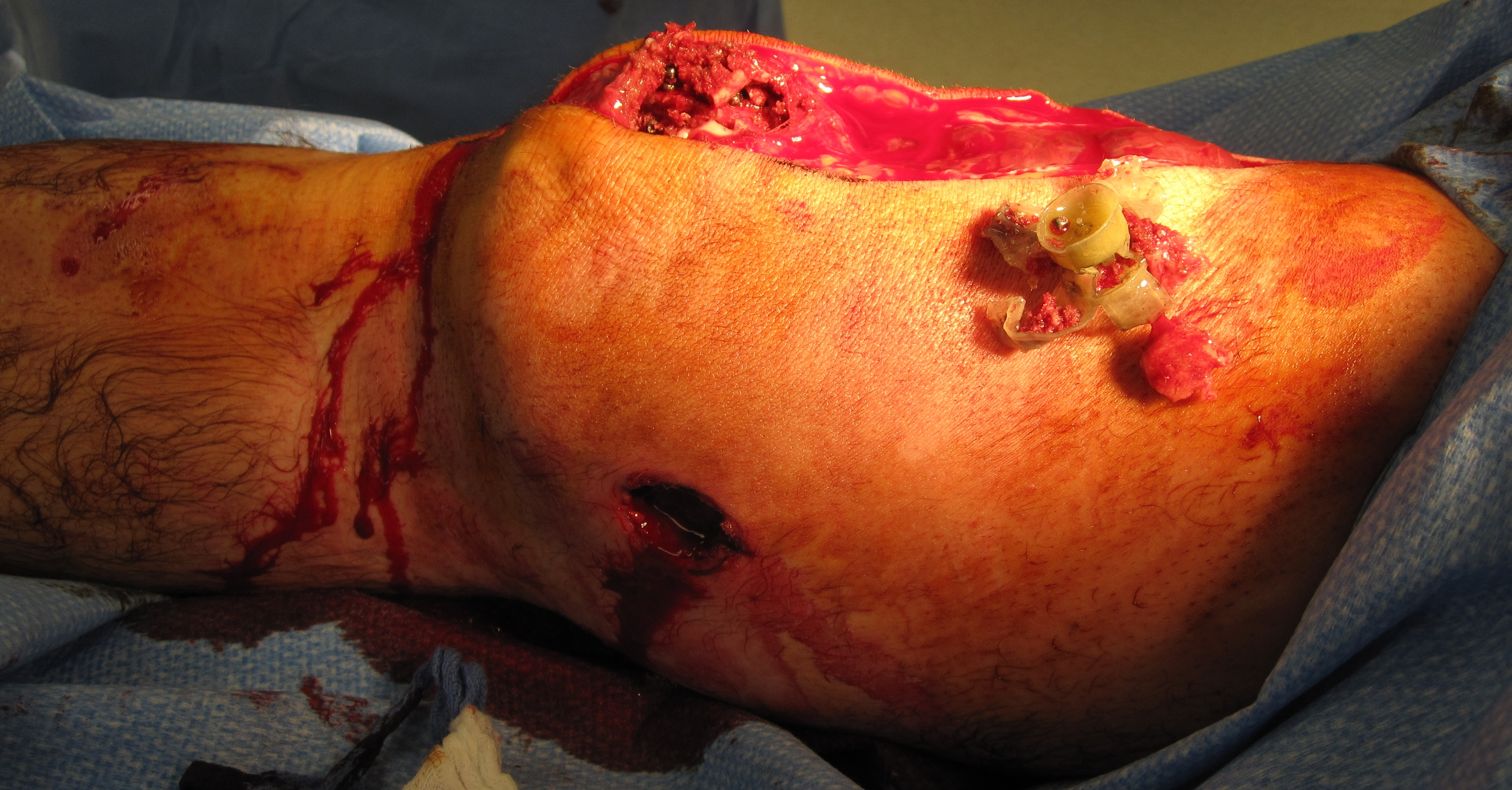
- Acute penetrating trauma from a close-range shotgun blast injury to knee. Birdshot pellets are visible in the wound, within the shattered patella. The powder wad from the shotgun shell has been extracted from the wound, and is visible at the upper right of the image.
- Specialty: Trauma surgery, General surgery, emergency medicine

Penetrating trauma is an open wound injury that occurs when an object pierces the skin and enters a tissue of the body, creating a deep but relatively narrow entry wound. In contrast, a blunt or non-penetrating trauma may have some deep damage, but the overlying skin is not necessarily broken and the wound is still closed to the outside environment. The penetrating object may remain in the tissues, come back out the path it entered, or pass through the full thickness of the tissues and exit from another area.

A penetrating injury in which an object enters the body or a structure and passes all the way through an exit wound is called a perforating trauma, while the term penetrating trauma implies that the object does not perforate wholly through. In gunshot wounds, perforating trauma is associated with an entrance wound and an often larger exit wound.

Penetrating trauma can be caused by a foreign object or by fragments of a broken bone. Usually occurring in violent crime or armed combat, penetrating injuries are commonly caused by gunshots and stabbings.

Penetrating trauma can be serious because it can damage internal organs and presents a risk of shock and infection. The severity of the injury varies widely depending on the body parts involved, the characteristics of the penetrating object, and the amount of energy transmitted to the tissues. Assessment may involve X-rays or CT scans, and treatment may involve surgery, for example to repair damaged structures or to remove foreign objects. Following penetrating trauma, spinal motion restriction is associated with worse outcomes and therefore it should not be done routinely.

== Mechanism ==
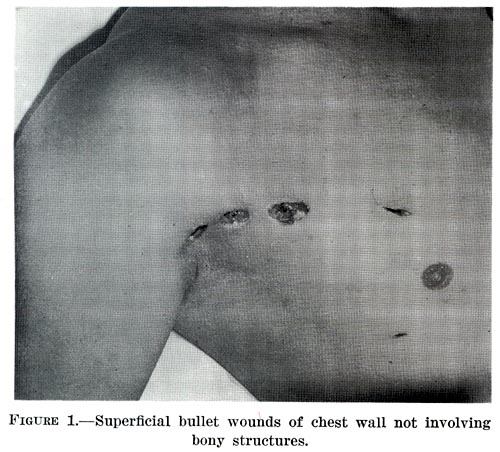
A superficial gunshot wound to the armpit

As a missile passes through tissue, it decelerates, dissipating and transferring kinetic energy to the tissues. The velocity of the projectile is a more important factor than its mass in determining how much damage is done; kinetic energy increases with the square of the velocity. In addition to injury caused directly by the object that enters the body, penetrating injuries may be associated with secondary injuries, due for example to a blast injury.

The path of a projectile can be estimated by imagining a line from the entrance wound to the exit wound, but the actual trajectory may vary due to ricochet or differences in tissue density. In a cut, the discolouration and the swelling of the skin from a blow happens because of the ruptured blood vessels and escape of blood and fluid and other injuries that interrupt the circulation.

=== Cavitation ===
==== Permanent ====
Low-velocity items, such as knives and swords, are usually propelled by a person's hand, and usually do damage only to the area that is directly contacted by the object. The space left by tissue that is destroyed by the penetrating object as it passes through forms a cavity; this is called permanent cavitation.

==== Temporary ====
High-velocity objects are usually projectiles such as bullets from high-powered rifles, such as assault rifles or sniper rifles. Bullets classed as medium-velocity projectiles include those from handguns, shotguns, and submachine guns. In addition to causing damage to the tissues they contact, medium- and high-velocity projectiles cause a secondary cavitation injury: as the object enters the body, it creates a pressure wave which forces tissue out of the way, creating a cavity which can be much larger than the object itself; this is called "temporary cavitation". The temporary cavity is the radial stretching of tissue around the bullet's wound track, which momentarily leaves an empty space caused by high pressures surrounding the projectile that accelerate material away from its path.

The characteristics of the tissue injured also help determine the severity of the injury; for example, the denser the tissue, the greater the amount of energy transmitted to it. Skin, muscles, and intestines absorb energy and so are resistant to the development of temporary cavitation, while organs such as the liver, spleen, kidney, and brain, which have relatively low tensile strength, are likely to split or shatter because of temporary cavitation. Flexible elastic soft tissues, such as muscle, intestine, skin, and blood vessels, are good energy absorbers and are resistant to tissue stretch. If enough energy is transferred, the liver may disintegrate. Temporary cavitation can be especially damaging when it affects delicate tissues such as the brain, as occurs in penetrating head trauma.

== Location ==
=== Head ===
While penetrating head trauma accounts for only a small percentage of all traumatic brain injuries (TBI), it is associated with a high mortality rate, and only a third of people with penetrating head trauma survive long enough to arrive at a hospital. Injuries from firearms are the leading cause of TBI-related deaths. Penetrating head trauma can cause cerebral contusions and lacerations, intracranial hematomas, pseudoaneurysms, and arteriovenous fistulas. The prognosis for penetrating head injuries varies widely.

Penetrating facial trauma can pose a risk to the airway and breathing; airway obstruction can occur later due to swelling or bleeding. Penetrating eye trauma can cause the globe of the eye to rupture or vitreous humor to leak from it, and presents a serious threat to eyesight.

=== Chest ===
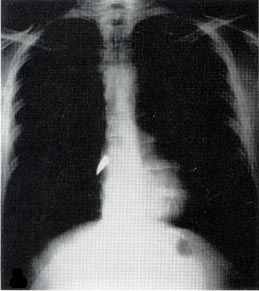
X-ray showing a bullet (white spot) in the heart

Most penetrating injuries are chest wounds and have a mortality rate (death rate) of under 10%. Penetrating chest trauma can injure vital organs such as the heart and lungs and can interfere with breathing and circulation. Lung injuries that can be caused by penetrating trauma include pulmonary laceration (a cut or tear) pulmonary contusion (a bruise), hemothorax (an accumulation of blood in the chest cavity outside of the lung), pneumothorax (an accumulation of air in the chest cavity) and hemopneumothorax (accumulation of both blood and air). Sucking chest wounds and tension pneumothorax may result. A pulmonary tractotomy may be need for deep penetrating lung trauma.

Penetrating trauma can also cause injuries to the heart and circulatory system. When the heart is punctured, it may bleed profusely into the chest cavity if the membrane around it (the pericardium) is significantly torn, or it may cause pericardial tamponade if the pericardium is not disrupted. In pericardial tamponade, blood escapes from the heart but is trapped within the pericardium, so pressure builds up between the pericardium and the heart, compressing the latter and interfering with its pumping. Fractures of the ribs commonly produce penetrating chest trauma when sharp bone ends pierce tissues.

=== Abdomen ===
Penetrating abdominal trauma (PAT) typically arises from stabbings, ballistic injuries (shootings), or industrial accidents. PAT can be life-threatening because abdominal organs, especially those in the retroperitoneal space, can bleed profusely, and the space can hold a large volume of blood. If the pancreas is injured, it may be further injured by its own secretions, in a process called autodigestion. Injuries of the liver, common because of the size and location of the organ, present a serious risk for shock because the liver tissue is delicate and has a large blood supply and capacity. The intestines, taking a large part of the lower abdomen, are also at risk of perforation.

People with penetrating abdominal trauma may have signs of hypovolemic shock (insufficient blood in the circulatory system) and peritonitis (an inflammation of the peritoneum, the membrane that lines the abdominal cavity). Penetration may abolish or diminish bowel sounds due to bleeding, infection, and irritation, and injuries to arteries may cause bruits (a distinctive sound similar to heart murmurs) to be audible. Percussion of the abdomen may reveal hyperresonance (indicating air in the abdominal cavity) or dullness (indicating a buildup of blood). The abdomen may be distended or tender, signs which indicate an urgent need for surgery.

The standard management of penetrating abdominal trauma was for many years mandatory laparotomy. A greater understanding of mechanisms of injury, outcomes from surgery, improved imaging and interventional radiology has led to more conservative operative strategies being adopted.

== Assessment and treatment ==
Assessment can be difficult because much of the damage is often internal and not visible. The patient is thoroughly examined. X-ray and CT scanning may be used to identify the type and location of potentially lethal injuries. Sometimes before an X-ray is performed on a person with penetrating trauma from a projectile, a paper clip is taped over entry and exit wounds to show their location on the film. The patient is given intravenous fluids to replace lost blood. Surgery may be required; impaled objects are secured into place so that they do not move and cause further injury, and they are removed in an operating room. If the location of the injury is not obvious, a surgical operation called an exploratory laparotomy may be required to look for internal damage to the organs in the abdomen. Foreign bodies such as bullets may be removed, but they may also be left in place if the surgery necessary to get them out would cause more damage than would leaving them. Wounds are debrided to remove tissue that cannot survive and other material that presents risk for infection.

Negative pressure wound therapy is no more effective in preventing wound infection than standard care when used on open traumatic wounds.

== History ==
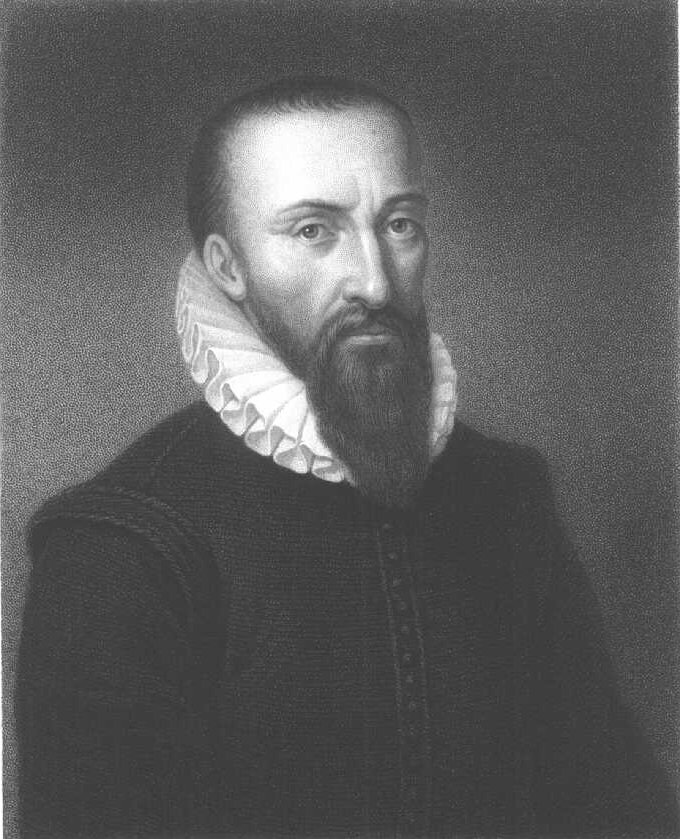
Ambroise Paré

Before the 17th century, medical practitioners poured hot oil into wounds in order to cauterize damaged blood vessels, but the French surgeon Ambroise Paré challenged the use of this method in 1545. Paré was the first to propose controlling bleeding using ligature.

During the American Civil War, chloroform was used during surgery to reduce pain and allow more time for operations. Due in part to the lack of sterile technique in hospitals, infection was the leading cause of death for wounded soldiers.

In World War I, doctors began replacing patients' lost fluid with salt solutions. With World War II came the idea of blood banking, having quantities of donated blood available to replace lost fluids. The use of antibiotics also came into practice in World War II.

== See also ==
- Aortic dissection
- Ballistic trauma
- Blunt splenic trauma
- Blunt trauma personal protective equipment
- Geriatric trauma
- Pediatric trauma
- Stab wound
- Transmediastinal gunshot wound
