= Trauma in children =

- Other names: Pediatric trauma
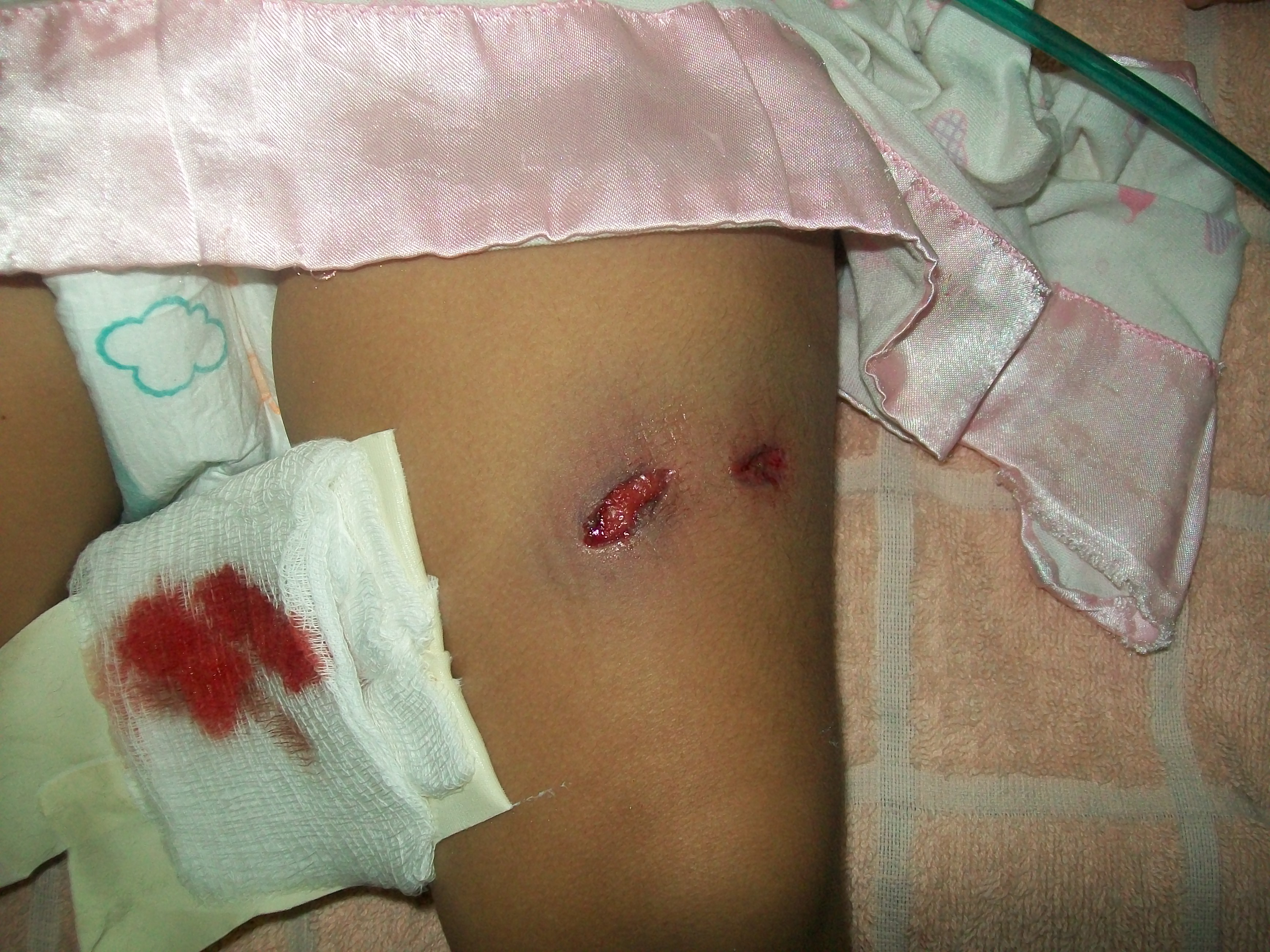
- A gunshot wound to the left thigh showing entry and exit wound of a 3 year old girl.
- Specialty: Emergency medicine

Trauma in children, also known as pediatric trauma, refers to a traumatic injury that happens to an infant, child or adolescent. Because of anatomical and physiological differences between children and adults the care and management of this population differs.

== Anatomic and physiologic differences ==
There are significant anatomical and physiological differences between children and adults. For example, the internal organs are closer in proximity to each other in children than in adults; this places children at higher risk of traumatic injury.

Children present a unique challenge in trauma care because they are so different from adults - anatomically, developmentally, physiologically and emotionally. A 2006 study concluded that the risk of death for injured children is lower when care is provided in pediatric trauma centers rather than in non-pediatric trauma centers. Yet about 10% of injured children are treated at pediatric trauma centers. The highest mortality rates occur in children who are treated in rural areas without access to trauma centers.

An important part of managing trauma in children is weight estimation. A number of methods to estimate weight exist, including the Broselow tape, Leffler formula, and Theron formula. Of these three methods, the Broselow tape is the most accurate for weight estimation in children ≤25 kg, while the Theron formula performs better with patients weighing >40 kg.

Due to basic geometry, a child's weight to surface area ratio is lower than an adult's, children more readily lose their body heat through radiation and have a higher risk of becoming hypothermic. Smaller body size in children often makes them more prone to poly traumatic injury.

== Diagnosis ==
=== Pediatric Trauma Score ===
Several classification systems have been developed that use some combination of subjective and objective data in an effort to quantify the severity of trauma. Examples include the Injury Severity Score and a modified version of the Glasgow Coma Scale. More complex classification systems, such as the Revised Trauma Score, APACHE II, and SAPS II add physiologic data to the equation in an attempt to more precisely define the severity, which can be useful in triaging casualties as well as in determining medical management and predicting prognosis.

Though useful, all of these measures have significant limitations when applied to pediatric patients. For this reason, health care providers often employ classification systems that have been modified or even specifically developed for use in the pediatric population. For example, the Pediatric Glasgow Coma Scale is a modification of the Glasgow Coma Scale that is useful in patients who have not yet developed language skills.

Emphasizing the importance of body weight and airway diameter, the Pediatric Trauma Score (PTS) was developed to specifically reflect the vulnerability of children to traumatic injury. The minimal score is -6 and the maximum score is +12. There is a linear relationship between the decrease in PTS and the mortality risk (i.e. the lower the PTS, the higher the mortality risk). Mortality is estimated at 9% with a PTS > 8, and at 100% with a PTS ≤ 0.

In most cases the severity of a pediatric trauma injury is determined by the pediatric trauma score despite the fact that some research has shown there is no benefit between it and the revised trauma scale.

== Management ==
The management of pediatric trauma depends on a knowledge of the physiological, anatomical, and developmental differences in comparison to an adult patient, this requires expertise in this area. In the pre-hospital setting issues may arise with the treatment of pediatric patients due to a lack of knowledge and resources involved in the treatment of these injuries. Despite the fact there is only a slight variation in outcomes in adult trauma centers, definitive care is best reached at a pediatric trauma center.

== Epidemiology ==
Most common causes of pediatric trauma

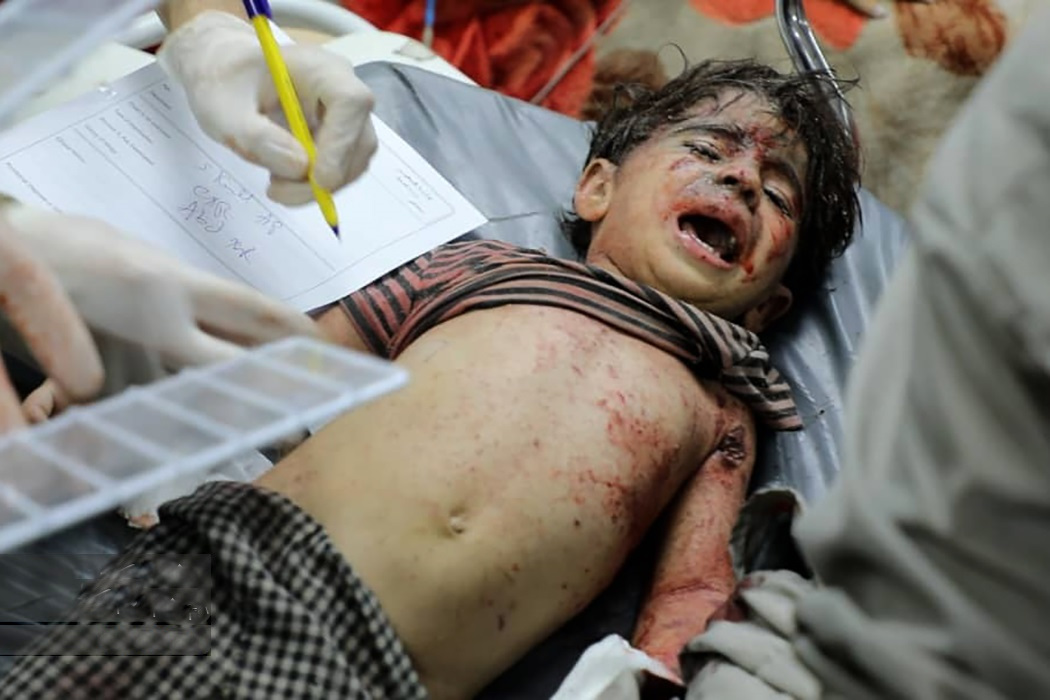
Injured child in Gaza, 17 October 2023

Based on the Centers for Disease Control and Prevention's (CDC) WISQARS database for the latest year of data (2010), serious injury kills nearly 10,000 children in America each year.

Pediatric trauma accounted for 59.5% of all mortality for children under 18 in 2004. Injury is the leading cause of death in this age group in the United States—greater than all other causes combined. It is also the leading cause of permanent paralysis for children. In the US approximately 16,000,000 children go to a hospital emergency room due to some kind of injury every year. Male children are more frequently injured than female children by a ratio of two to one. Some injuries, including chemical eye burns, are more common among young children than among their adult counterparts; these are largely due to cleaning supplies and similar chemicals commonly found around the home. Similarly, penetrating injuries in children is because of writing utensils and other common household objects as many are readily available to children in the course of their day.

Israel's attacks on the Gaza Strip during the Gaza war caused Gaza to have the highest number of child amputees per capita in the world. In August 2025, UNICEF estimated that more than 50,000 children had been killed or injured in Gaza.

== See also ==
- Blunt trauma
- Blast injury
- Geriatric trauma
- Penetrating trauma
- Pediatric Advanced Life Support
