= Trauma surgery =

Surgical specialty

- ICD-10-PCS: Y83.9

Trauma Surgeon
Occupation
- Names: Physician; Surgeon
- Occupation type: Specialty
- Activity sectors: Medicine, Surgery

Description
- Education required: Doctor of Medicine (M.D.); Doctor of Osteopathic Medicine (D.O.); Bachelor of Medicine, Bachelor of Surgery (M.B.B.S.); Bachelor of Medicine, Bachelor of Surgery (MBChB)
- Fields of employment: Hospitals, Clinics

Trauma surgery is a surgical specialty that utilizes both operative and non-operative management to treat traumatic injuries, typically in an acute setting. Trauma surgeons generally complete residency training in general surgery and often fellowship training in trauma or surgical critical care. The trauma surgeon is responsible for initially resuscitating and stabilizing and later evaluating and managing the patient. The attending trauma surgeon also leads the trauma team, which typically includes nurses and support staff, as well as resident physicians in teaching hospitals.

== Training ==
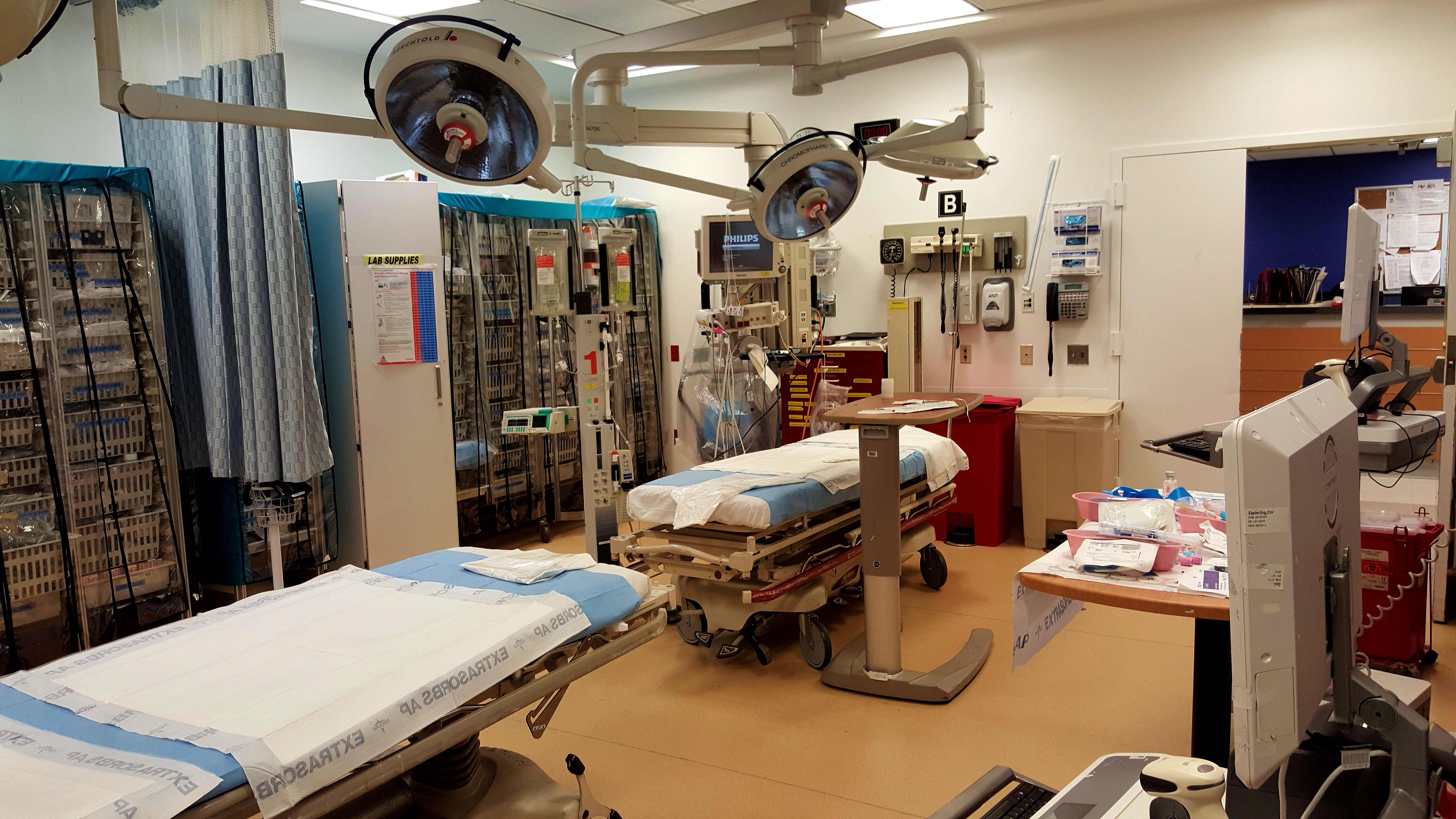
A trauma bay at Kings County Hospital Center in Brooklyn, New York

Most United States trauma surgeons practice in larger centers and complete a 1–2 year trauma-surgery fellowship, which often includes a surgical critical-care fellowship. They may therefore sit for the American Board of Surgery (ABS) certifying examination in surgical critical care. National surgical boards usually supervise European training programs; they also certify for subspecialization in trauma surgery. An official European trauma surgical examination exists.

Training for trauma surgeons is often difficult to obtain. In the US, the Advanced Trauma Operative Management (ATOM) course and the Advanced Surgical Skills for Exposure in Trauma (ASSET) provide operative trauma training to surgeons and surgeons in training. The Advanced Trauma Life Support course (ATLS) is what most US practitioners who take care of trauma patients are required to take (emergency medicine, surgery, and trauma attending physicians, physician extenders, as well as trainees).

== Responsibilities ==
The broad scope of their surgical critical care training enables trauma surgeons to address most injuries to the neck, chest, abdomen, and extremities. In large parts of Europe, trauma surgeons treat most of the musculoskeletal trauma, whereas injuries to the central nervous system are generally treated by neurosurgeons. In the US and Britain, skeletal injuries are treated by trauma orthopedic surgeons. Facial injuries are often treated by maxillofacial surgeons. Significant variation occurs across hospitals in the degree to which other specialists, such as cardiothoracic surgeons, plastic surgeons, vascular surgeons, and interventional radiologists are involved in treating trauma patients.

Trauma surgeons must be familiar with a large variety of general surgical, thoracic, and vascular procedures and must be able to make complex decisions, often with little time and incomplete information. Proficiency in all aspects of intensive care medicine/critical care is required. Hours are irregular with a considerable amount of night, weekend, and holiday work.

Most patients presenting to trauma centers have multiple injuries involving different organ systems, so the care of such patients often requires a significant number of diagnostic studies and operative procedures. The trauma surgeon is responsible for prioritizing such procedures and for designing the overall treatment plan. This process starts as soon as the patient arrives in the emergency department and continues to the operating room, intensive care unit, and hospital floor. In most settings, patients are evaluated according to a set of predetermined protocols (triage) designed to detect and treat life-threatening conditions as soon as possible. After such conditions have been addressed (or ruled out), non–life threatening injuries are addressed.

== Acute care surgery ==
Over the last few decades, a large number of advances in trauma and critical care have led to an increasing frequency of non-operative care for injuries to the neck, chest, and abdomen. Most injuries requiring operative treatment are musculoskeletal. For this reason, part of US trauma surgeons devote at least some of their practice to general surgery. In most American university hospitals and medical centers, a significant portion of the emergency general surgery calls are taken by trauma surgeons. The field combining trauma surgery and emergency general surgery is often called acute care surgery.

== History ==
George E. Goodfellow is credited as the United States' first civilian trauma surgeon. He opened a medical practice in the silver boom town of Tombstone, Arizona Territory, in November 1880, where he practiced for the next 11 years.

On July 2, 1881, U.S. President Garfield was shot in the abdomen by Charles J. Guiteau. Two days later, a miner was shot outside Tombstone. On July 13, 1881, Goodfellow performed the first recorded laparotomy to treat the miner's gunshot wound. The man had a perforated small intestine, large intestine, and bowel. Goodfellow sutured six holes in the man's organs. Similarly, President Garfield was thought later to have a bullet possibly lodged near his liver, but it could not be found. Sixteen doctors attended to Garfield and most probed the wound with their fingers or dirty instruments. Unlike the President, the miner survived.

Goodfellow treated a number of notorious outlaw cowboys in Tombstone, Arizona, during the 1880s, including Curly Bill Brocius. During the gunfight at the O.K. Corral on October 26, 1881, Deputy U.S. Marshal Virgil Earp and his brother Assistant Deputy U.S. Marshal Morgan Earp were both seriously wounded. Goodfellow treated both men's injuries. Goodfellow treated Virgil Earp again two months later on December 28, 1881, after he was ambushed, removing 3 inches (76 mm) of bone from his humerus and attended to Morgan Earp on March 18, 1882, when he was shot while playing a round of billiards at the Campbell and Hatch Billiard Parlor. Morgan died of his wounds.

Goodfellow once traveled to Bisbee, 30 miles (48 km) from Tombstone, to treat an abdominal gunshot wound. He operated on the patient stretched out on a billiard table. Goodfellow removed a .45-caliber bullet, washed out the cavity with hot water, folded the intestines back into position, stitched the wound closed with silk thread, and ordered the patient to take it to a hard bed for recovery. He wrote about the operation: "I was entirely alone having no skilled assistant of any sort, therefore was compelled to depend for aid upon willing friends who were present—these consisting mostly of hard-handed miners just from their work on account of the fight. The anesthetic was administered by a barber, lamps held, hot water brought, and other assistance rendered by others."

Goodfellow pioneered the use of sterile techniques in treating gunshot wounds, washing the patient's wound and his hands with lye soap or whisky. He became America's leading authority on gunshot wounds and was widely recognized for his skill as a surgeon.

By the late 1950s, mandatory laparotomy had become the standard of care for managing patients with abdominal penetrating trauma. A laparotomy is still the standard procedure for treating abdominal gunshot wounds today.

== In the United Kingdom ==
In the United Kingdom, trauma surgery is now generally considered a subspeciality of general surgery. However, at the Royal London Hospital, which is Britain's busiest major trauma centre and the busiest trauma unit in Europe, trauma surgeons come from backgrounds in vascular surgery.

Courses in the UK for aspiring trauma surgeons include the advanced trauma life support and Definitive Surgical Trauma Skills courses, both provided by the Royal College of Surgeons.

== See also ==
- Transmediastinal gunshot wound
- Eastern Association for the Surgery of Trauma, a major association of trauma surgeons in the U.S.
