= Dermatoses induced by personal protective equipment =

Skin conditions linked to protective clothing

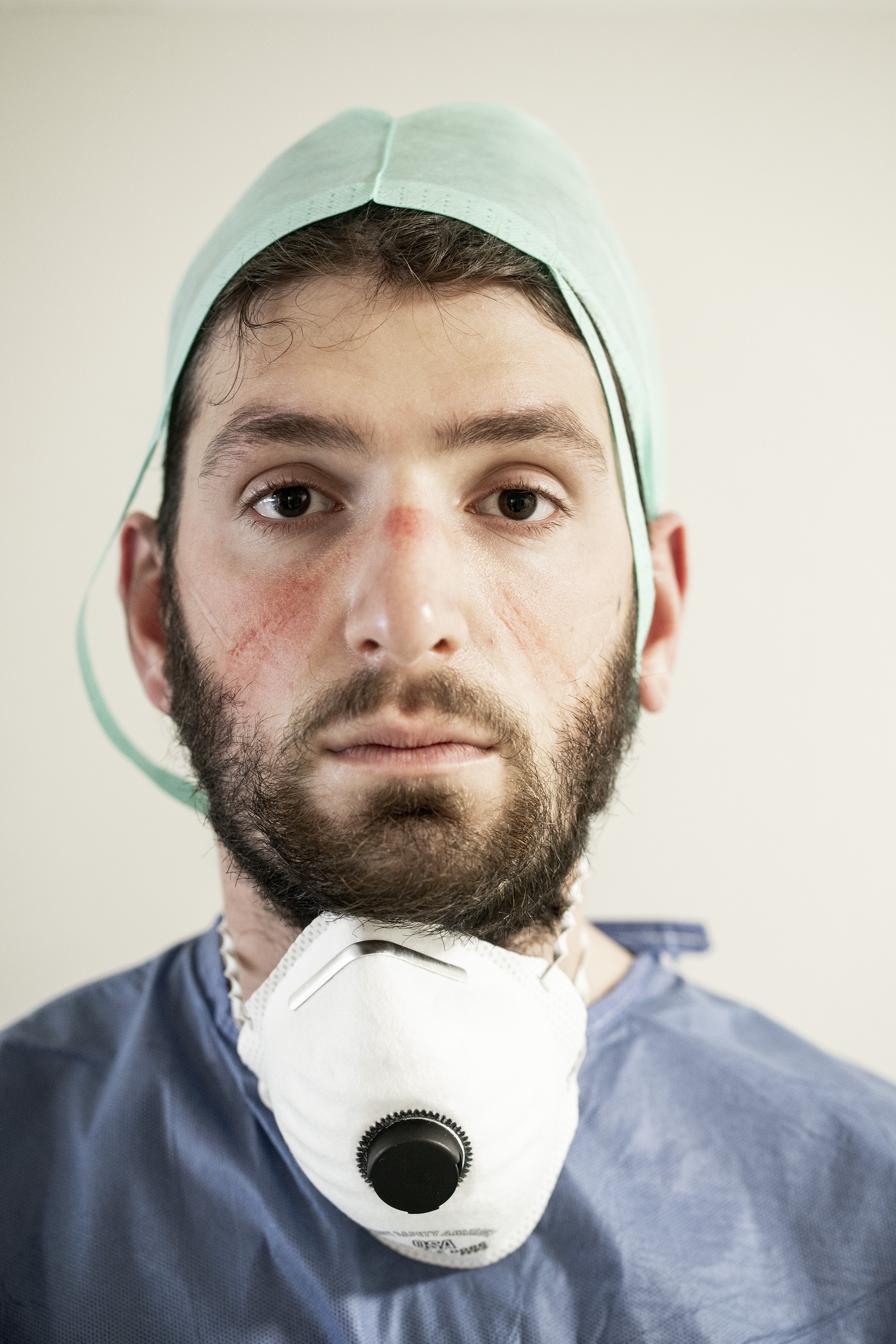
Skin rashes on the face of a healthcare professional following the use of N95 mask

Dermatoses induced by Personal Protective Equipment are skin lesions that occur due to the use of personal protective equipment (PPE). Personal Protective Equipment such as masks, face shields, goggles, gloves and gowns can cause abrasion in the skin and retain moisture in body parts, particularly the face. During the COVID-19 pandemic, healthcare workers and general public need to use personal protective equipment, sometimes for extended duration, which may result in skin problems due to friction, pressure, long-term sealing and moisture retention.

== Extent ==
A Chinese study reports that 97% of the frontline health workers have some kind of skin damage. This study also reports that the healthcare workers who wore PPE for more than 6 hours had higher risks of skin damage than those who wore it for less time. Goggles, N95 masks and hand hygiene measures had the maximum odds for inflicting a skin damage, while gloves and face shield had the least. The commonly reported symptoms following the use of PPE where tenderness (70%), itching (57%) and burning pain (38%). The commonly reported skin lesions were erythema, maceration, fissure, papule, erosion, ulceration, vesicle formation and wheal formation. The sites most prone to PPE-induced skin lesion are nasal bridge, cheek, hands and forehead.

== Sites ==
=== Facial skin damage ===
Respiratory protective equipment needs to be worn tightly on the face, which can lead to poor blood circulation, tissue ischemia and hypoxia. Large amount of water vapour from the exhaled air into the goggles and mask can keep the facial skin moist, which can soften the skin, making it prone to indentations. When personal protective equipment is tightly worn on the face for extended periods of time, it can lead to the formation of erythema, blisters and ulcers.

=== Hair damage ===
Helmets worn as a part of PPE have poor permeability and can cause the accumulation of large amounts of oil and sweat. This can lead to folliculitis and seborrheic dermatitis.

=== Hand and foot skin damage ===
Gloves and boots worn as a part of PPE are mostly waterproof and have poor air permeability. As a result, the skin becomes prone to eczema. Repeated hand washing and contact with irritant sanitising agents can result in contact dermatitis.

== Prevention and treatment ==
Prevention of PPE-related injuries is important because it can reduce PPE protocol breaches due to inadvertent adjustment and touching.

=== Contact dermatitis ===
Prevention of contact dermatitis can be made possible by avoiding substances that one is allergic to, such as by switching to a glove made using an alternative material if one has latex allergy. Topical moisturizing products which contain emollients and humectants repair the skin barrier and retain adequate moisture. Ointment preparations and creams can be used on the affected area. Topical corticosteroids are used in case of mild cases of contact dermatitis and oral cortisone in case of severe cases.

=== Facial dermatoses ===
N-95 masks being used in the hospital should be first tested for fit, in order to ensure equitable distribution of pressure across the face. The American Academy of Dermatology recommends keeping the facial skin clean and moisturised to avoid having skin diseases. Moisturiser should be applied at least one hour before donning the N95 masks. The academy also recommends skipping makeup, such as foundation and concealers.

== Consequences and impact ==
Facial dermatoses can have an impact on mental health in some people.
