= Personal protective equipment =

Equipment designed to help protect an individual from hazards

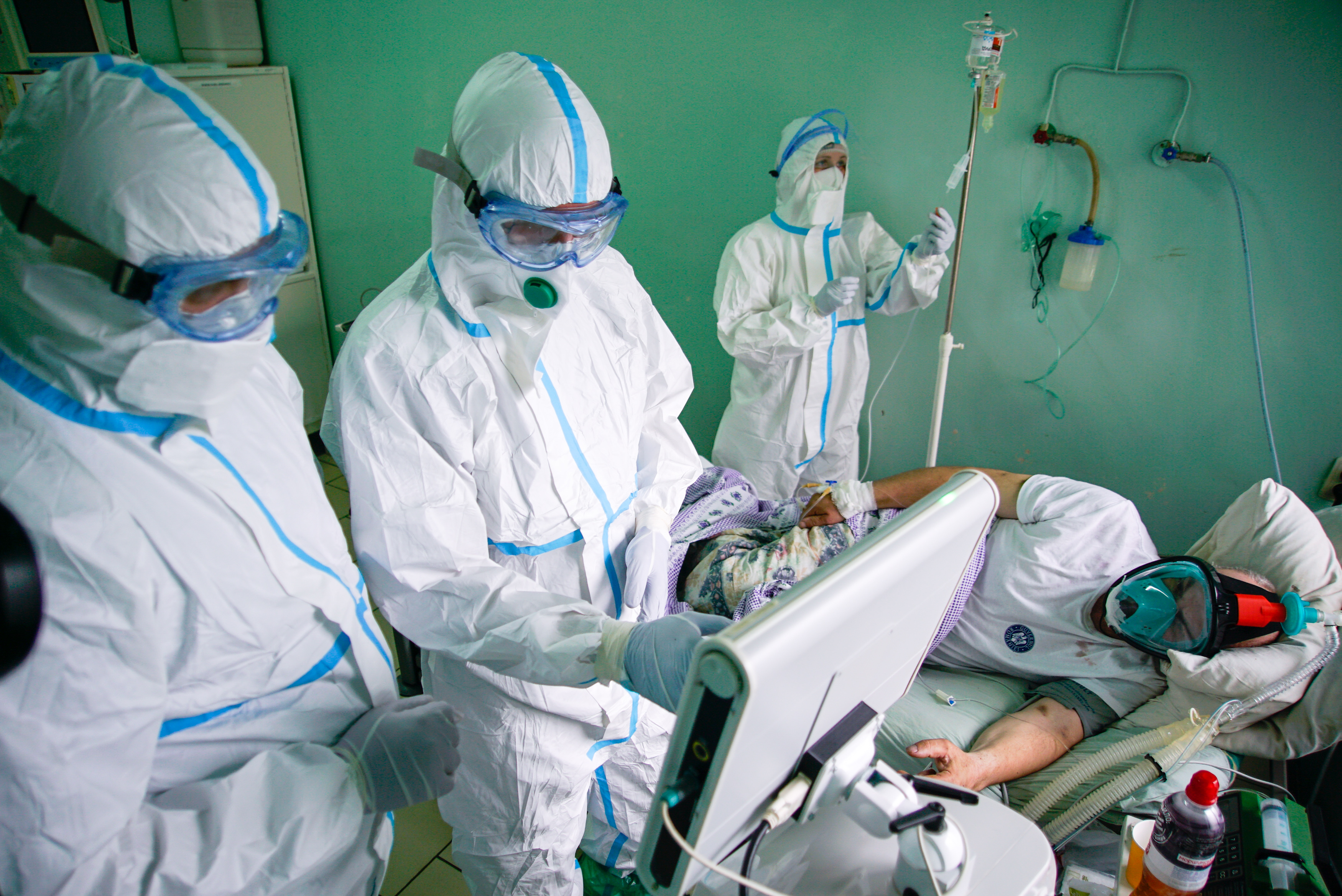
Ukrainian doctors wear personal protective equipment in 2020 during the COVID-19 pandemic

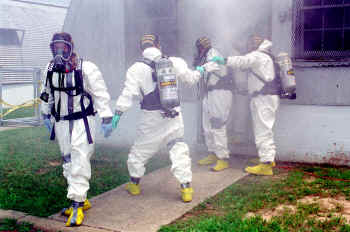
Drug Enforcement Administration (DEA) agents wearing Level B hazmat suits

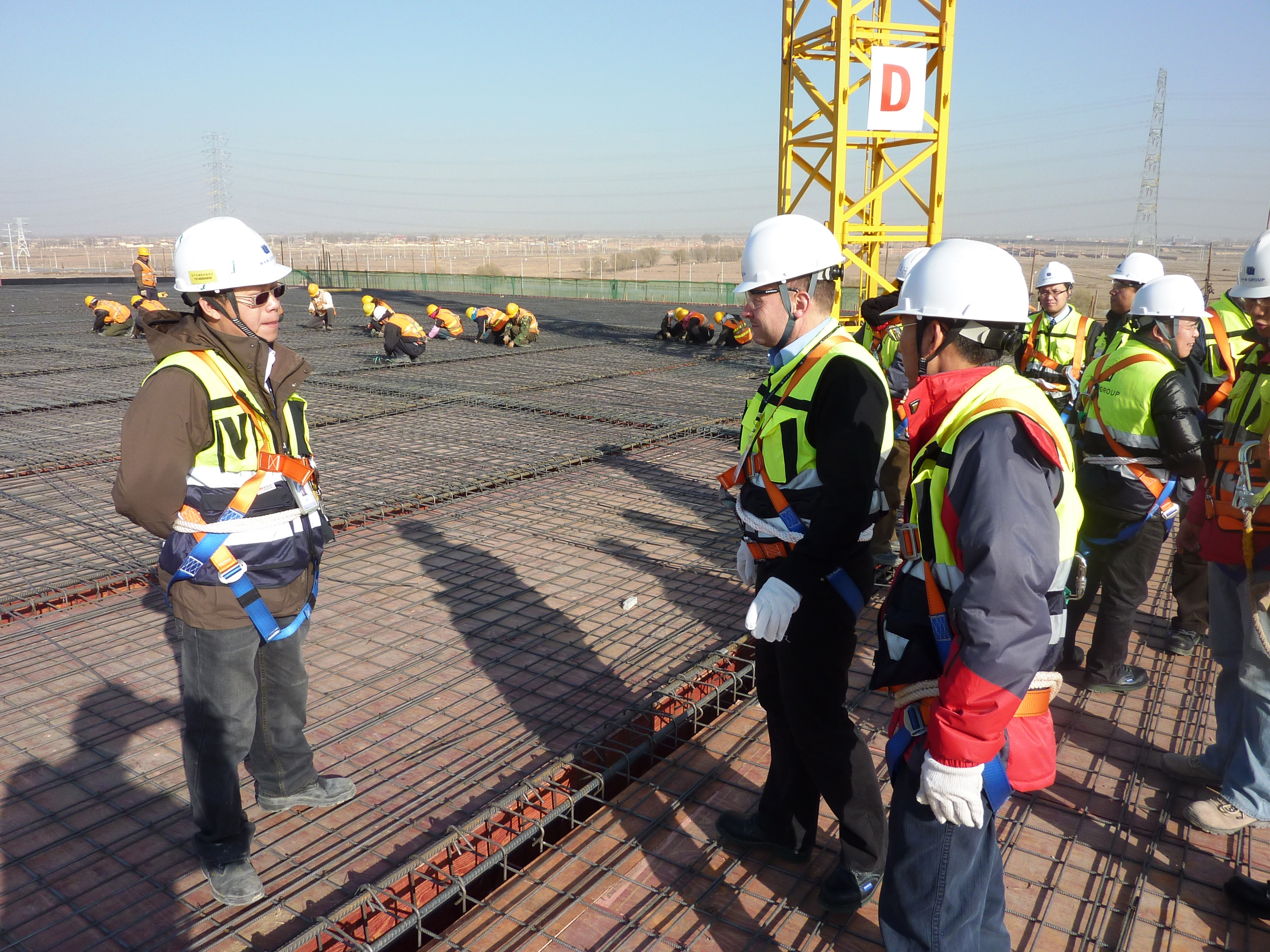
Safety equipment and supervisor instructions at a construction site

Personal protective equipment (PPE) is protective clothing, helmets, goggles, or other garments or equipment designed to protect the wearer's body from injury or infection. The hazards addressed by protective equipment include physical, electrical, heat, chemical, biohazards, and airborne particulate matter. Protective equipment may be worn for job-related occupational safety and health purposes, as well as for sports and other recreational activities. Protective clothing is applied to traditional categories of clothing, and protective gear applies to items such as pads, guards, shields, or masks, and others. PPE suits can be similar in appearance to a cleanroom suit.

The purpose of personal protective equipment is to reduce employee exposure to hazards when engineering controls and administrative controls are not feasible or effective to reduce these risks to acceptable levels. PPE is needed when there are hazards present. PPE has the serious limitation that it does not eliminate the hazard at the source and may result in employees being exposed to the hazard if the equipment fails.

Any item of PPE imposes a barrier between the wearer/user and the working environment. This can create additional strains on the wearer, impair their ability to carry out their work and create significant levels of discomfort. Any of these can discourage wearers from using PPE correctly, therefore placing them at risk of injury, ill-health or, under extreme circumstances, death. Good ergonomic design can help to minimise these barriers and can therefore help to ensure safe and healthy working conditions through the correct use of PPE.

Practices of occupational safety and health can use hazard controls and interventions to mitigate workplace hazards, which pose a threat to the safety and quality of life of workers. The hierarchy of hazard controls provides a policy framework which ranks the types of hazard controls in terms of absolute risk reduction. At the top of the hierarchy are elimination and substitution, which remove the hazard entirely or replace the hazard with a safer alternative. If elimination or substitution measures cannot be applied, engineering controls and administrative controls – which seek to design safer mechanisms and coach safer human behavior – are implemented. Personal protective equipment ranks last on the hierarchy of controls, as the workers are regularly exposed to the hazard, with a barrier of protection. The hierarchy of controls is important in acknowledging that, while personal protective equipment has tremendous utility, it is not the desired mechanism of control in terms of worker safety.

== History ==
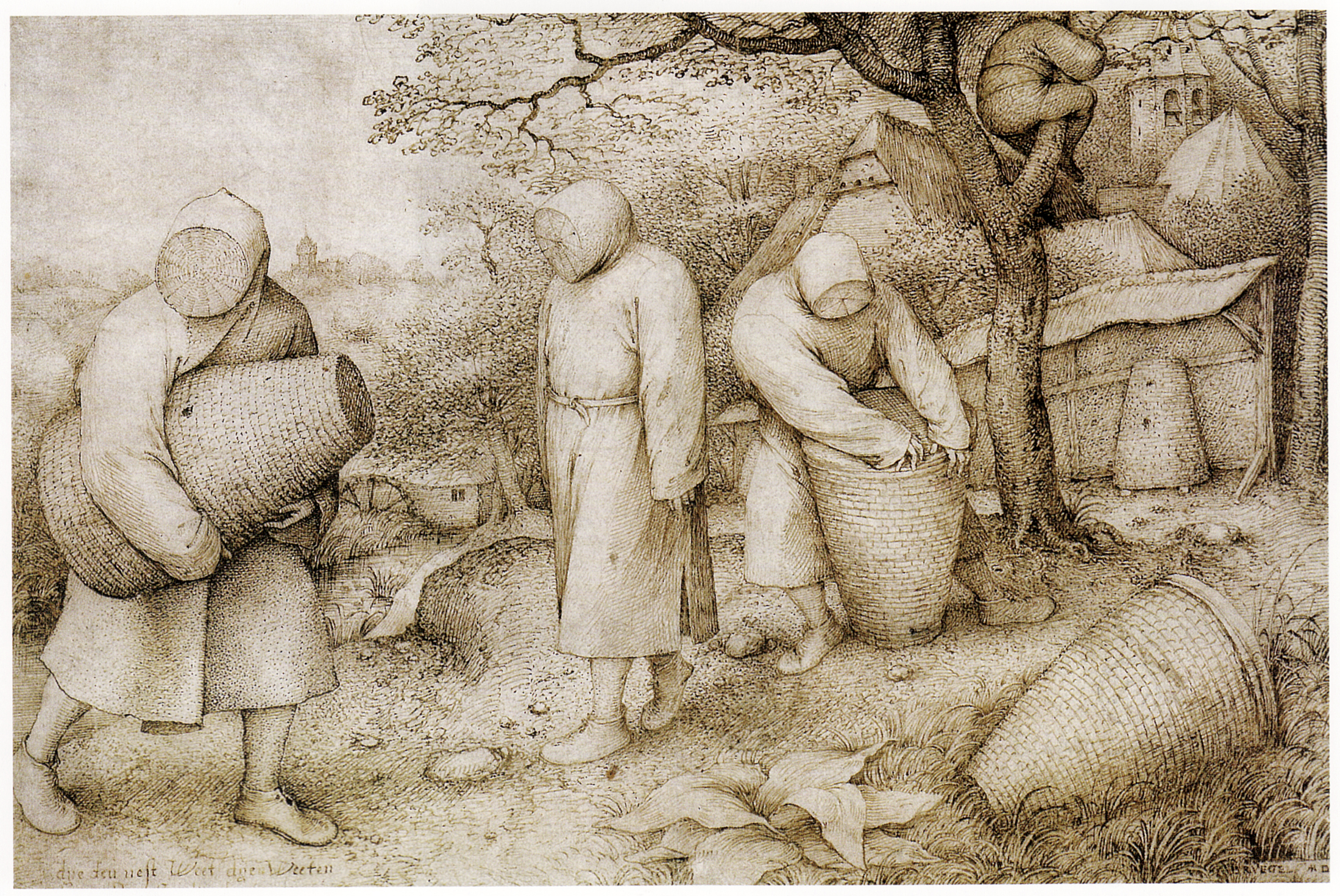
A 1568 painting depicting beekeepers in protective clothing, by Pieter Brueghel the Elder

Early PPE such as body armor, boots and gloves focused on protecting the wearer's body from physical injury. The plague doctors of sixteenth-century Europe also wore protective uniforms consisting of a full-length gown, helmet, glass eye coverings, gloves and boots (see Plague doctor costume) to prevent contagion when dealing with plague victims. These were made of thick material which was then covered in wax to make it water-resistant. A mask with a beak-like structure was filled with pleasant-smelling flowers, herbs and spices to prevent the spread of miasma, the prescientific belief of bad smells which spread disease through the air.

In more recent years, scientific personal protective equipment is generally believed to have begun with the cloth facemasks promoted by Wu Lien-teh in the 1910–11 Manchurian pneumonic plague outbreak, although some doctors and scientists of the time doubted the efficacy of facemasks in preventing the spread of that disease since they didn't believe it was transmitted through the air.

== Types ==
Imports of ppe related products per capita

Personal protective equipment can be categorized by the area of the body protected, by the type of hazard, and by the type of garment or accessory. A single item – for example, boots – may provide multiple forms of protection: a steel toe cap and steel insoles for protection of the feet from crushing or puncture injuries, impervious rubber and lining for protection from water and chemicals, high reflectivity and heat resistance for protection from radiant heat, and high electrical resistivity for protection from electric shock. The protective attributes of each piece of equipment must be compared with the hazards expected to be found in the workplace. More breathable types of personal protective equipment may not lead to more contamination but do result in greater user satisfaction.

=== Respirators ===
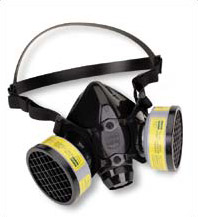
Air-purifying respirator

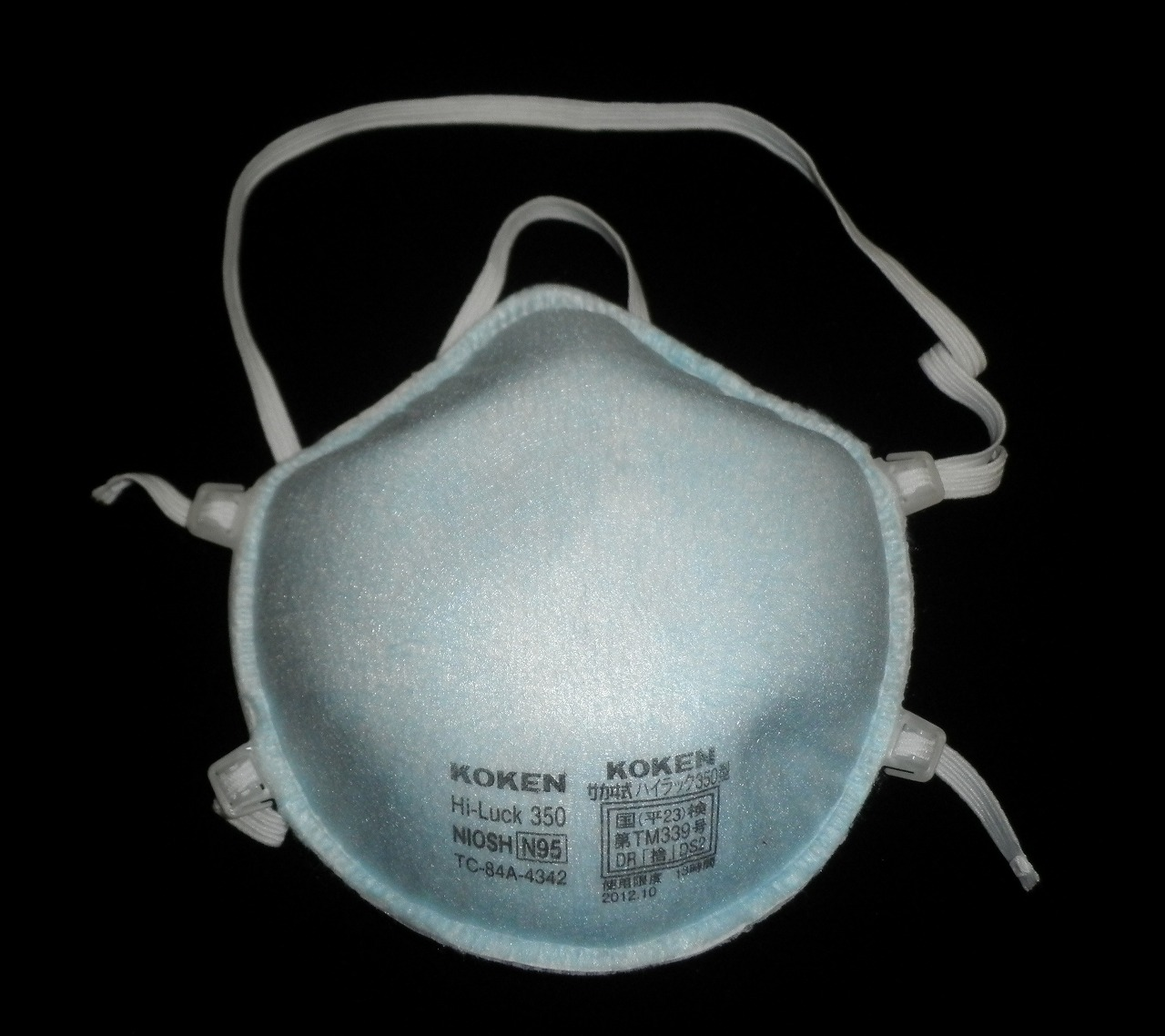
N95 mask

Respirators are protective breathing equipment, which protect the user from inhaling contaminants in the air, thus preserving the health of their respiratory tract. There are two main types of respirators. One type of respirator functions by filtering out chemicals and gases, or airborne particles, from the air breathed by the user. The filtration may be either passive or active (powered). Gas masks and particulate respirators (like N95 masks) are examples of this type of respirator. A second type of respirator protects users by providing clean, respirable air from another source. This type includes airline respirators and self-contained breathing apparatus (SCBA). In work environments, respirators are relied upon when adequate ventilation is not available or other engineering control systems are not feasible or inadequate.

In the United Kingdom, an organization that has extensive expertise in respiratory protective equipment is the Institute of Occupational Medicine. This expertise has been built on a long-standing and varied research programme that has included the setting of workplace protection factors to the assessment of efficacy of masks available through high street retail outlets.

The Health and Safety Executive (HSE), NHS Health Scotland and Healthy Working Lives (HWL) have jointly developed the RPE (Respiratory Protective Equipment) Selector Tool, which is web-based. This interactive tool provides descriptions of different types of respirators and breathing apparatuses, as well as "dos and don'ts" for each type.

In the United States, The National Institute for Occupational Safety and Health (NIOSH) provides recommendations on respirator use, in accordance to NIOSH federal respiratory regulations 42 CFR Part 84. The National Personal Protective Technology Laboratory (NPPTL) of NIOSH is tasked towards actively conducting studies on respirators and providing recommendations.

==== Surgical masks ====
Surgical masks are sometimes considered as PPE, but are not considered as respirators, being unable to stop submicron particles from passing through, and also having unrestricted air flow at the edges of the masks.

Surgical masks are not certified for the prevention of tuberculosis.

=== Skin protection ===
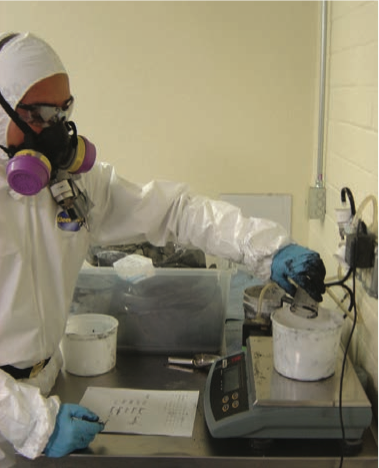
A worker wearing a respirator, lab coat, and gloves while weighing carbon nanotubes

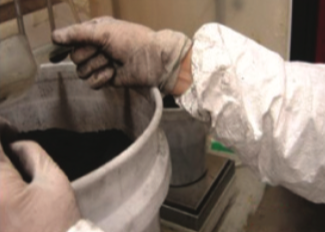
This is an incorrect use of personal protective equipment, because the gap between the glove and the lab coat exposes the wrist to hazardous materials.

Occupational skin diseases such as contact dermatitis, skin cancers, and other skin injuries and infections are the second-most common type of occupational disease and can be very costly. Skin hazards, which lead to occupational skin disease, can be classified into four groups. Chemical agents can come into contact with the skin through direct contact with contaminated surfaces, deposition of aerosols, immersion or splashes. Physical agents such as extreme temperatures and ultraviolet or solar radiation can be damaging to the skin over prolonged exposure. Mechanical trauma occurs in the form of friction, pressure, abrasions, lacerations and contusions. Biological agents such as parasites, microorganisms, plants and animals can have varied effects when exposed to the skin.

Any form of PPE that acts as a barrier between the skin and the agent of exposure can be considered skin protection. Because much work is done with the hands, gloves are an essential item in providing skin protection. Some examples of gloves commonly used as PPE include rubber gloves, cut-resistant gloves, chainsaw gloves and heat-resistant gloves. For sports and other recreational activities, many different gloves are used for protection, generally against mechanical trauma.

Other than gloves, any other article of clothing or protection worn for a purpose serve to protect the skin. Lab coats for example, are worn to protect against potential splashes of chemicals. Face shields serve to protect one's face from potential impact hazards, chemical splashes or possible infectious fluid.

Many migrant workers need training in PPE for Heat Related Illnesses prevention (HRI). Based on study results, research identified some potential gaps in heat safety education. While some farm workers reported receiving limited training on pesticide safety, others did not. This could be remedied by incoming groups of farm workers receiving video and in-person training on HRI prevention. These educational programs for farm workers are most effective when they are based on health behavior theories, use adult learning principles and employ train-the-trainer approaches.

=== Eye protection ===
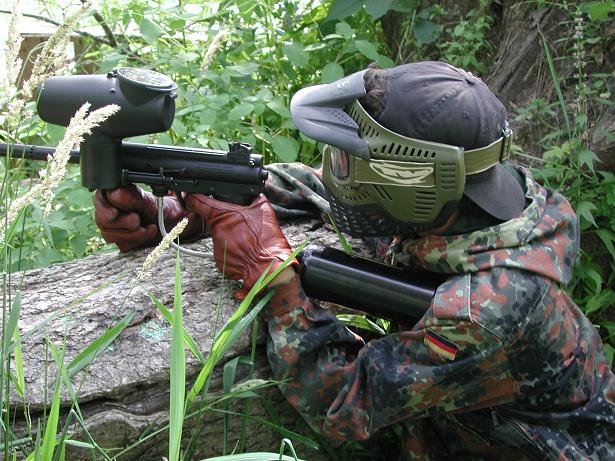
A paintball player wearing appropriate eye protection against impact

Each day, about 2,000 US workers have a job-related eye injury that requires medical attention. Eye injuries can happen through a variety of means. Most eye injuries occur when solid particles such as metal slivers, wood chips, sand or cement chips get into the eye. Smaller particles in smokes and larger particles such as broken glass also account for particulate matter-causing eye injuries. Blunt force trauma can occur to the eye when excessive force comes into contact with the eye. Chemical burns, biological agents, and thermal agents, from sources such as welding torches and UV light, also contribute to occupational eye injury.

While the required eye protection varies by occupation, the safety provided can be generalized. Safety glasses provide protection from external debris, and should provide side protection via a wrap-around design or side shields.

- Goggles provide better protection than safety glasses, and are effective in preventing eye injury from chemical splashes, impact, dusty environments and welding. Goggles with high air flow should be used to prevent fogging.
- Face shields provide additional protection and are worn over the standard eyewear; they also provide protection from impact, chemical, and blood-borne hazards.
- Full-facepiece respirators are considered the best form of eye protection when respiratory protection is needed as well, but may be less effective against potential impact hazards to the eye.
- Eye protection for welding is shaded to different degrees, depending on the specific operation.

=== Hearing protection ===
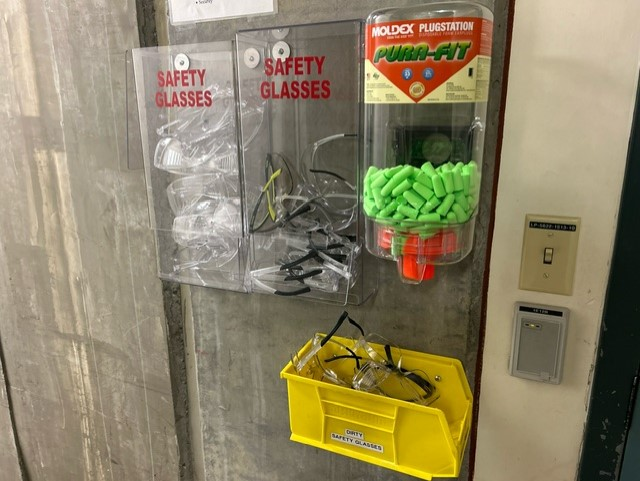
A PPE station, containing eye protection and earplugs, as well as a place to dispose of dirty glasses

Industrial noise is often overlooked as an occupational hazard, as it is not visible to the eye. Overall, about 22 million workers in the United States are exposed to potentially damaging noise levels each year. Occupational hearing loss accounted for 14% of all occupational illnesses in 2007, with about 23,000 cases significant enough to cause permanent hearing impairment. About 82% of occupational hearing loss cases occurred to workers in the manufacturing sector. In the US the Occupational Safety and Health Administration establishes occupational noise exposure standards. The National Institute for Occupational Safety and Health recommends that worker exposures to noise be reduced to a level equivalent to 85 dBA for eight hours to reduce occupational noise-induced hearing loss.

PPE for hearing protection consists of earplugs and earmuffs. Workers who are regularly exposed to noise levels above the NIOSH recommendation should be provided with hearing protection by the employers, as they are a low-cost intervention. A personal attenuation rating can be objectively measured through a hearing protection fit-testing system. The effectiveness of hearing protection varies with the training offered on their use. In January 2025 NIOSH published a Science Policy Update recommending employers use individual, quantitative fit testing to evaluate the attenuation received by workers from their hearing protection devices.

=== Protective clothing and ensembles ===
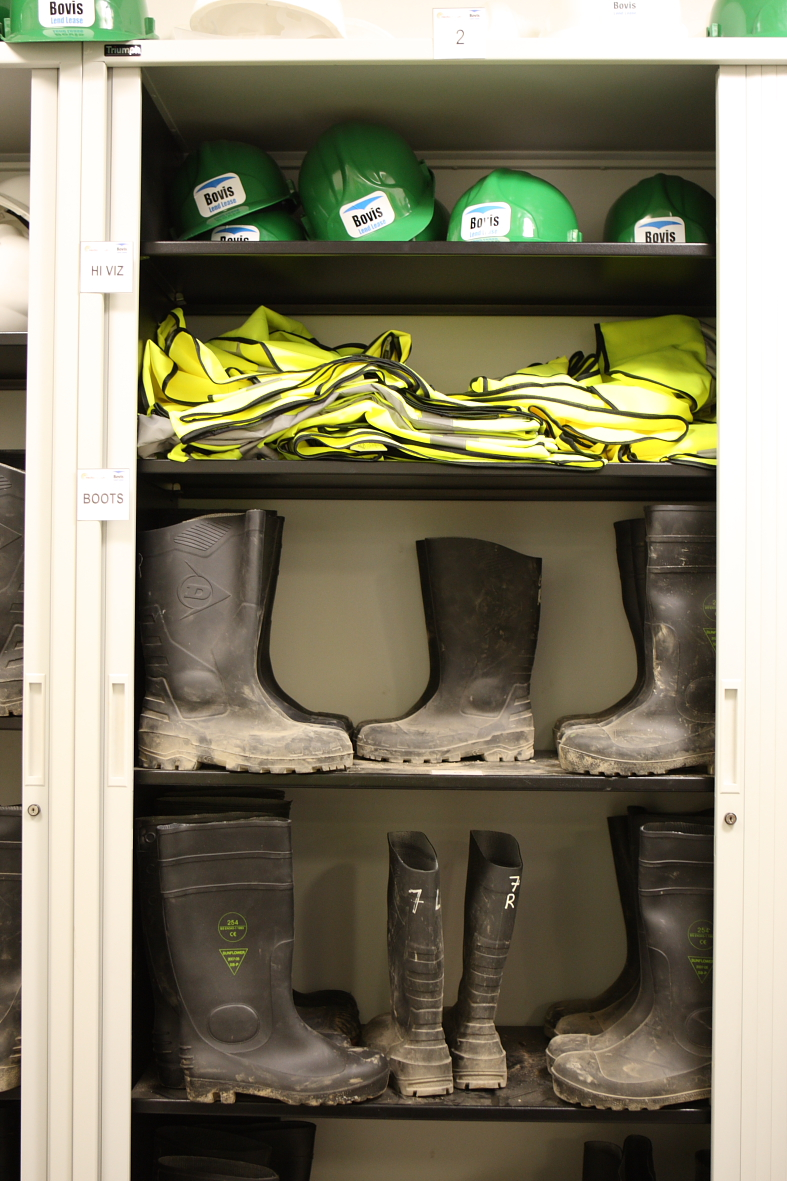
Locker containing personal protective equipment

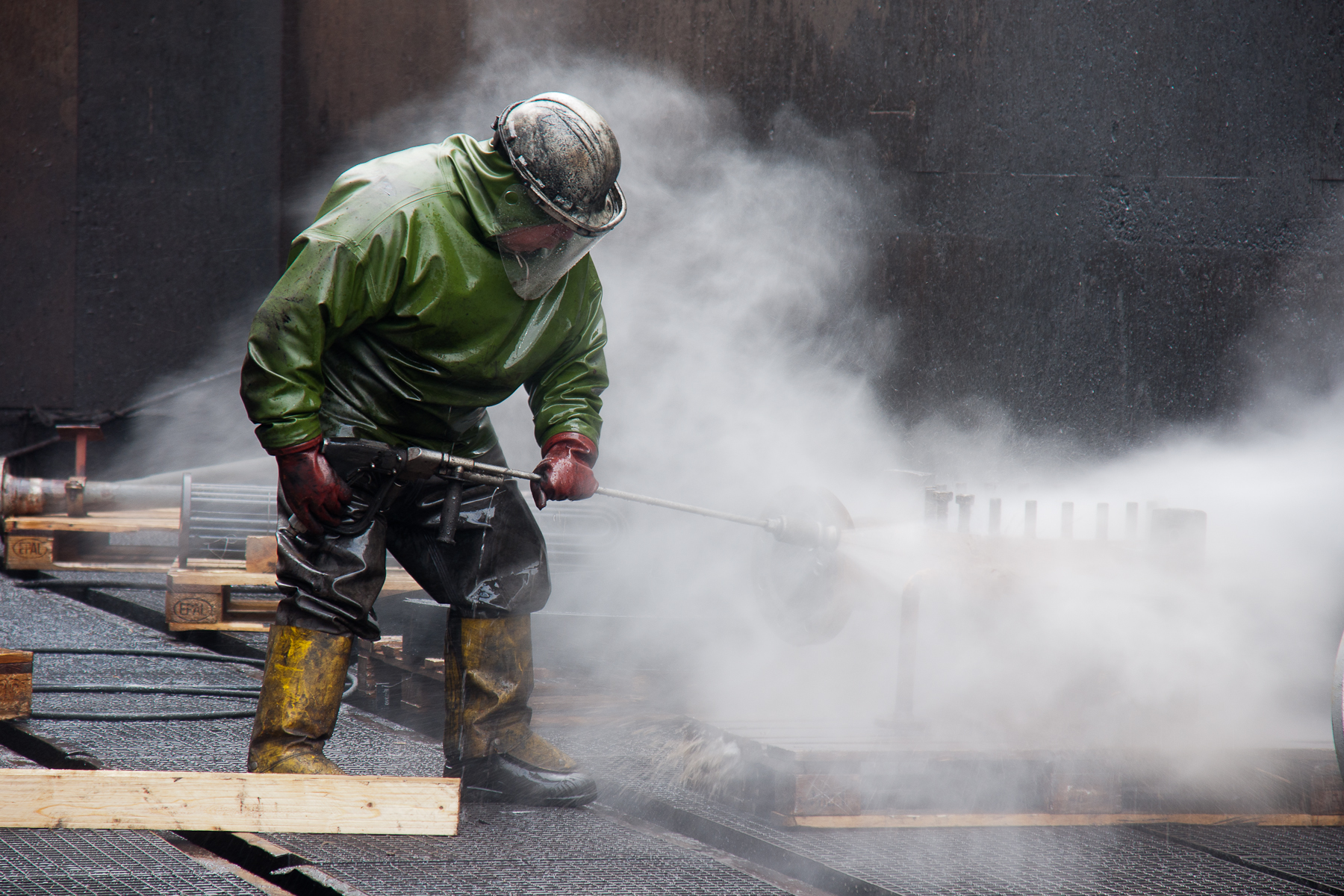
A complete PPE ensemble worn during high pressure cleaning work

This form of PPE is all-encompassing and refers to the various suits and uniforms worn to protect the user from harm. Lab coats worn by scientists and ballistic vests worn by law enforcement officials, which are worn on a regular basis, would fall into this category. Entire sets of PPE, worn together in a combined suit, are also in this category.

==== Ensembles ====
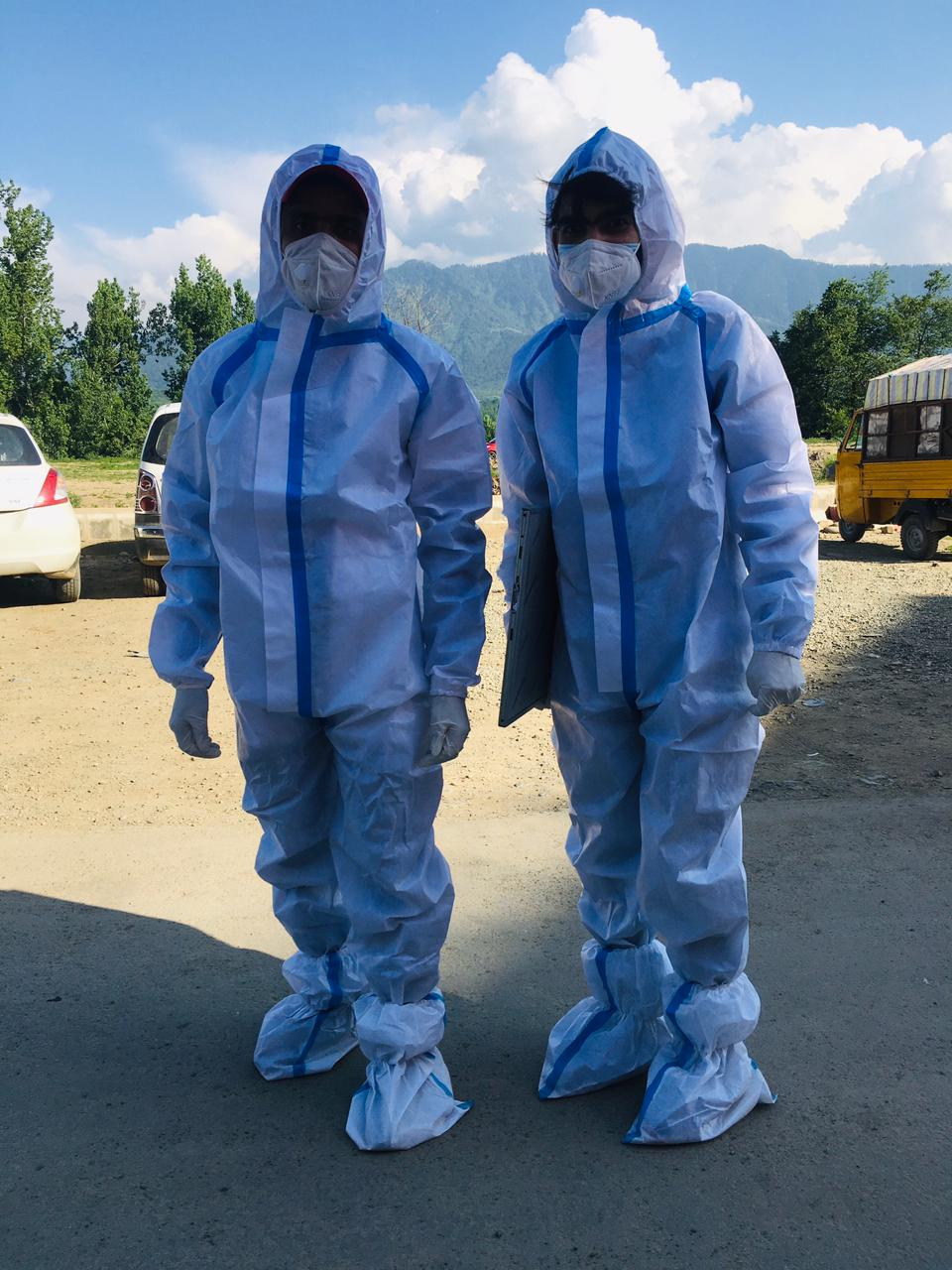
Medical PPE gowns worn by medical personnel during the COVID-19 pandemic

Below are some examples of ensembles of personal protective equipment, worn together for a specific occupation or task, to provide maximum protection for the user:

- PPE gowns are used by medical personnel like doctors and nurses.
- Chainsaw protection (especially a helmet with face guard, hearing protection, kevlar chaps, anti-vibration gloves, and chainsaw safety boots).
- Bee-keepers wear various levels of protection depending on the temperament of their bees and the reaction of the bees to nectar availability. At minimum, most beekeepers wear a brimmed hat and a veil made of fine mesh netting. The next level of protection involves leather gloves with long gauntlets and some way of keeping bees from crawling up one's trouser legs. In extreme cases, specially fabricated shirts and trousers can serve as barriers to the bees' stingers.
- Diving equipment, for underwater diving, constitutes equipment such as a diving helmet or diving mask, an underwater breathing apparatus, and a diving suit.
- Firefighters wear PPE designed to provide protection against fires and various fumes and gases. PPE worn by firefighters include bunker gear, self-contained breathing apparatus, a helmet, safety boots, and a PASS device.

==== In sports ====
Participants in sports often wear protective equipment. Studies performed on the injuries of professional athletes, such as that on NFL players, question the effectiveness of existing personal protective equipment.

== Harms ==
PPE use is not without side effects, a common problem being dermatoses.

== Limits of the definition ==
The definition of what constitutes personal protective equipment varies by country. In the United States, the laws regarding PPE also vary by state. In 2011, workplace safety complaints were brought against Hustler and other adult film production companies by the AIDS Healthcare Foundation, leading to several citations brought by Cal/OSHA. The failure to use condoms by adult film stars was a violation of Cal/OSHA's Blood borne Pathogens Program, Personal Protective Equipment. This example shows that personal protective equipment can cover a variety of occupations in the United States, and has a wide-ranging definition.

== Legislation ==
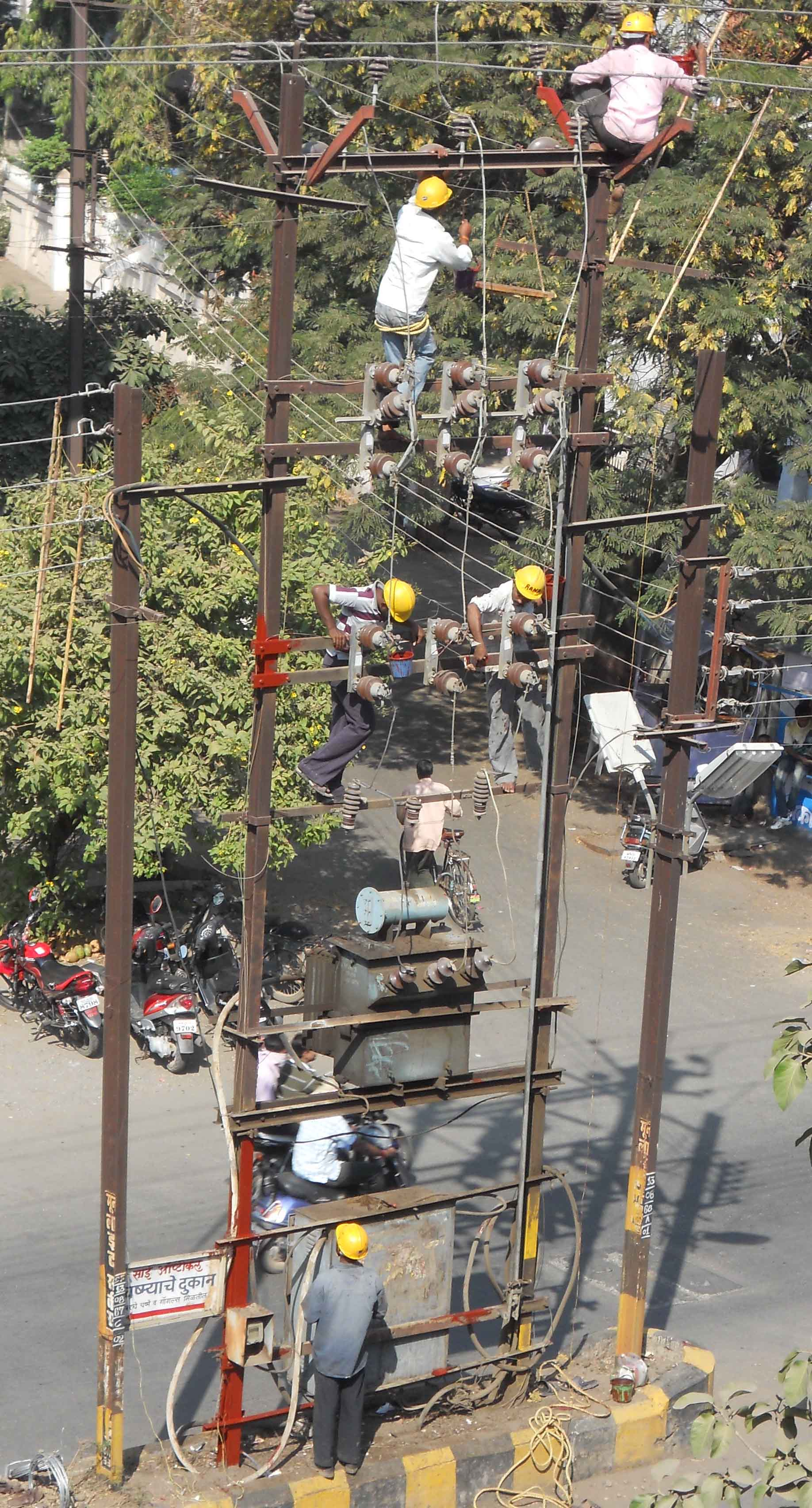
Workers using personal protective equipment while painting poles. While basic head protection is present, no engineering fall protection systems appear to be in place.

=== United States ===
The National Defense Authorization Act for 2022 defines personal protective equipment as

Equipment for use in preventing spread of disease, such as by exposure to infected individuals or contamination or infection by infectious material (including nitrile and vinyl gloves, surgical masks, respirator masks and powered air purifying respirators and required filters, face shields and protective eyewear, surgical and isolation gowns, and head and foot coverings) or clothing, and the materials and components thereof, other than sensors, electronics, or other items added to and not normally associated with such personal protective equipment or clothing.

Under this Act, US military services are prohibited from purchasing PPE from suppliers in North Korea, China, Russia or Iran, unless there are problems with the supply or cost of PPE of "satisfactory quality and quantity".

=== European Union ===
At the European Union level, personal protective equipment is governed by Directive 89/686/EEC on personal protective equipment (PPE). The Directive is designed to ensure that PPE meets common quality and safety standards by setting out basic safety requirements for personal protective equipment, as well as conditions for its placement on the market and free movement within the EU single market. It covers "any device or appliance designed to be worn or held by an individual for protection against one or more health and safety hazards". The directive was adopted on 21 January 1989 and came into force on 1 July 1992. The European Commission additionally allowed for a transition period until 30 June 1995 to give companies sufficient time to adapt to the legislation. After this date, all PPE placed on the market in EU Member States was required to comply with the requirements of Directive 89/686/EEC and carry the CE Marking.

Article 1 of Directive 89/686/EEC defines personal protective equipment as any device or appliance designed to be worn or held by an individual for protection against one or more health and safety hazards. PPE which falls under the scope of the Directive is divided into three categories:

- Category I: simple design (e.g. gardening gloves, footwear, ski goggles)
- Category II: PPE not falling into category I or III (e.g. personal flotation devices, dry and wet suits, motorcycle personal protective equipment)
- Category III: complex design (e.g. respiratory equipment, harnesses)

Directive 89/686/EEC on personal protective equipment does not distinguish between PPE for professional use and PPE for leisure purposes.

Personal protective equipment falling within the scope of the Directive must comply with the basic health and safety requirements set out in Annex II of the Directive. To facilitate conformity with these requirements, harmonized standards are developed at the European or international level by the European Committee for Standardization (CEN, CENELEC) and the International Organization for Standardization in relation to the design and manufacture of the product. Usage of the harmonized standards is voluntary and provides presumption of conformity. However, manufacturers may choose an alternative method of complying with the requirements of the Directive.

Personal protective equipment excluded from the scope of the Directive includes:

- PPE designed for and used by the armed forces or in the maintenance of law and order;
- PPE for self-defence (e.g. aerosol canisters, personal deterrent weapons);
- PPE designed and manufactured for personal use against adverse atmospheric conditions (e.g. seasonal clothing, umbrellas), damp and water (e.g. dish-washing gloves) and heat;
- PPE used on vessels and aircraft but not worn at all times;
- helmets and visors intended for users of two- or three-wheeled motor vehicles.

The European Commission is currently working to revise Directive 89/686/EEC. The revision will look at the scope of the Directive, the conformity assessment procedures and technical requirements regarding market surveillance. It will also align the Directive with the New Legislative Framework. The European Commission is likely to publish its proposal in 2013. It will then be discussed by the European Parliament and Council of the European Union under the ordinary legislative procedure before being published in the Official Journal of the European Union and becoming law.

== Research ==
Research studies in the form of randomized controlled trials and simulation studies are needed to determine the most effective types of PPE for preventing the transmission of infectious diseases to healthcare workers.

There is low certainty evidence that supports making improvements or modifications to PPE in order to help decrease contamination. Examples of modifications include adding tabs to masks or gloves to ease removal and designing protective gowns so that gloves are removed at the same time. In addition, there is low certainty evidence that the following PPE approaches or techniques may lead to reduced contamination and improved compliance with PPE protocols: Wearing double gloves, following specific doffing (removal) procedures such as those from the CDC, and providing people with spoken instructions while removing PPE.

== See also ==
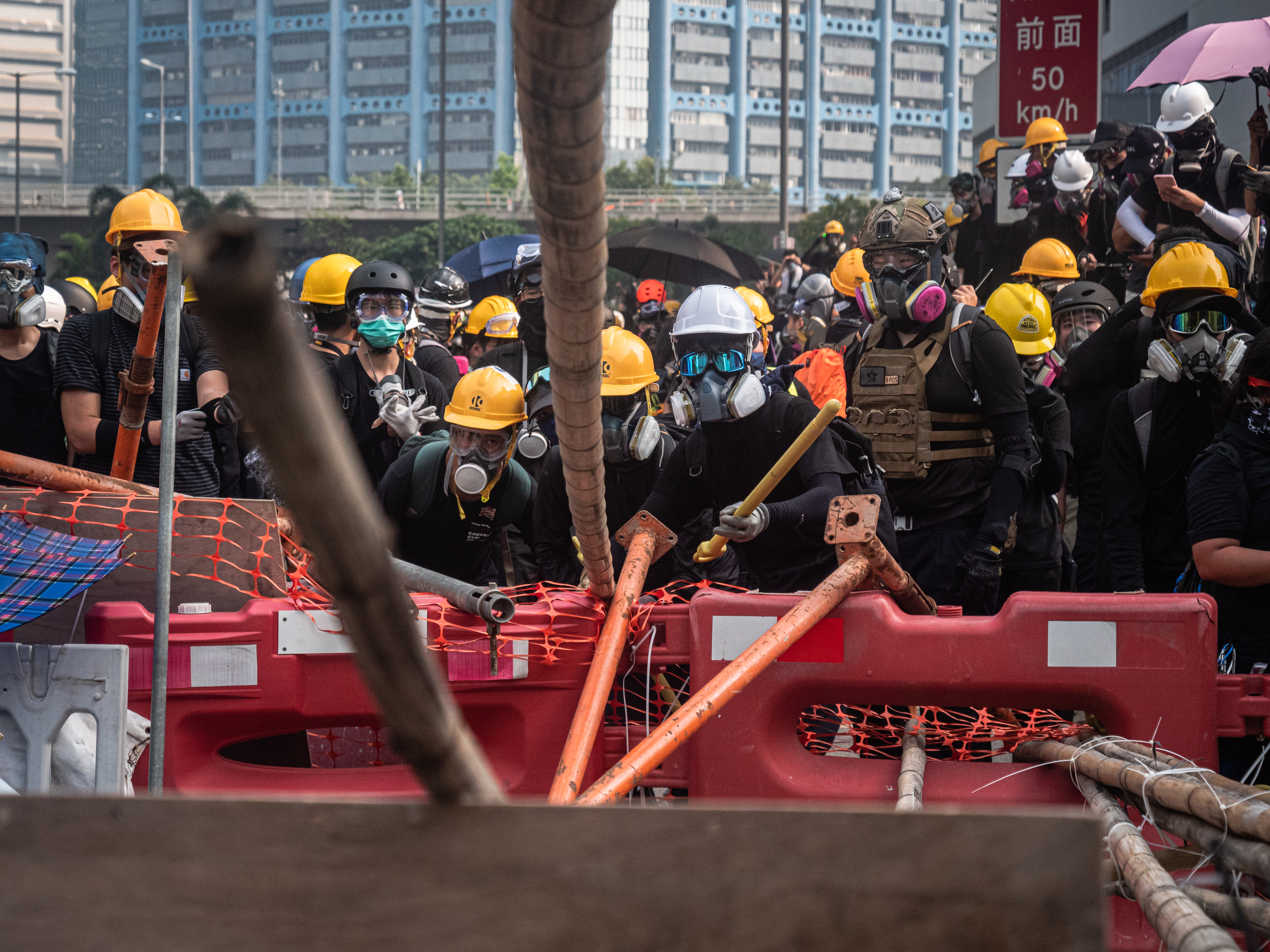
During the 2019–2020 Hong Kong protests, protesters adopted the black bloc method and wore helmets and respirators to protect themselves. Yellow hard hats became a symbol for the protest movement.

- Biological hazard – Biological material that poses serious risks to the health of living organisms
- Blunt trauma personal protective equipment
- Bomb disposal – Activity to dispose of and render safe explosive munitions and other materials
- CBRN defense – Protective measures against hazardous materials warfare (Chemical Biological Radiological Nuclear, known formerly as NBC)
- Chainsaw safety clothing – Personal protective equipment for operators of chainsaws
- Chemical protective clothing – Clothing used to protect against chemical hazards
- Combat suit – Protective clothing; armor worn on the body
- Environmental suit – Clothing worn to protect a person in a hostile environment
- Fall arrest – Equipment which safely stops a person already falling
- Hard hat – Protective industrial headwear
- Hazmat – Substances harmful to people, property or the environment (hazardous materials)
- High-visibility clothing – Safety clothing
- Motorcycle personal protective equipment – Protective clothing and helmets for motorcycle safety
- NBC suit – Type of military personal protective equipment
- Personal flotation device – Equipment to help the wearer keep afloat in water
- Personal protective equipment for arc flash – Heat and light produced during an electrical arc fault
- PPE Portrait project – Way to humanize medical staff wearing PPE
- Safe handling of hazardous drugs
- Safety harness – Equipment designed to protect from falling
- Usage of personal protective equipment – Use of protective clothing against hazards
- Workplace hazard controls for COVID-19 – Prevention measures for COVID-19
- Normalization of deviance – one reason people stop using effective prevention measures
