= Pulmonary tractotomy =

- Specialty: Pulmonologist

A pulmonary tractotomy is a surgical technique to treat a penetrating lung injury. The tract of the lung injury is opened, and open bronchi and blood vessels are ligated (sewn).

== Treatment of penetrating lung injuries ==
Emergency surgery for a penetrating lung injury, e.g. an accident or a gunshot, is associated with a very high mortality rate.

Such lung injuries cannot be treated with simple surgery; they cannot be oversewn. If treated with simple surgery, blood vessels within the tract of the lung injury may continue to bleed and result in a haematoma which should be avoided. Or the patient may suffer a pulmonary air embolism and subsequently die.

Penetrating lung injuries can be treated with a formal lung resection or with pulmonary tractotomy.

== Comparison of treatments ==
Pulmonary tractotomy is a lung sparing technique. It can prevent the need for formal lung resection. Its advantages over segmental lung resection include that it can be performed quicker; it offers a rapid way to control bleeding (haemorrhage) and air leaks in patients with penetrating lung injuries. Also, pulmonary tractotomy can preserve healthy pulmonary tissue (parenchyma); this naturally is not possible with lung resection.

However, overall patient outcome is the same with pulmonary tractotomy and lung resection; both are viable surgical treatment options. This is because patient outcome in penetrating lung injury is related mainly to the severity of injury, rather than the type of treatment.
