= Blunt trauma personal protective equipment =

Blunt trauma personal protective equipment (PPE) protects the wearer against injuries caused by blunt impacts. For law enforcement, corrections, military, and other personnel involved in emergency response operations, the protection against blunt impact threats can be a matter of life or death. To quantify the levels of protection of a Blunt Trauma PPE, users and industry rely on technical standards. A balance between protection and functionality allow users to have good flexibility and mobility. Good air ventilation underneath the PPE suit can protect users against heat stroke or hyperthermia.

== Blunt impact threats ==
Law enforcement and corrections officers are involved in crowd management, civil disturbances, cell extractions, riot control, violent disturbances, and other emergency response operations. During these highly dynamic situations, blunt impact threats are associated with hand-held objects, thrown objects, improvised weapons, personal assaults, punches, thrusts, kicks or falls. Those threats can result in minor to unsurvivable injuries, which are quantified with an injury severity score on the Abbreviated Injury Scale (AIS).

== Impact attenuation standards ==
To assure their blunt trauma equipment is safe, end-users and industry refer to the impact attenuation criteria as the test methods and criteria set out in the following standards, which apply to personal protective apparel intended to provide protection to the torso, arms and legs, including joints.

- Canadian Standards Association: CAN/CSA Z617-06 Personal Protective Equipment for Blunt Trauma.
- Home Office Scientific Development Branch: HOSDB Blunt Trauma Protector Standard for UK Police (2007) - Limb and Torso Protectors 20-07.

A blunt impact PPE meeting the impact attenuation criteria set out in the standards is qualified via test methods and criteria that have been established by a professional, and recognized technical committee consisting of corrections officers, law enforcement officers, industry participants, laboratory specialists, technical experts, and related individuals and organizations involved with blunt impact PPE, who are experts and specialists in this field. The technical committee undertakes a formal process to investigate, evaluate and quantify blunt impact threats, and then research and develop test methods and criteria to determine compliance of given systems with respect to the essential impact protection for users.

== Flexibility and mobility ==
Blunt trauma PPE generally involves a balance between protection and function; some compromises can be made in the protection in order to permit sufficient function for the wearer. The equipment offer users a range of motion (flexibility), and ease-of-motion (mobility), while maintaining the necessary impact protection and coverage areas. Experts in human factors and ergonomics help deliver systems that do not impede or fatigue users while they are wearing PPE equipment, resulting in a comfortable and functional suit. Users will have much greater comfort (and thus less distraction and irritation) and their functionality and ability to perform necessary roles, tasks and actions, will not be impeded.

== Cooling and heat stress reduction ==
During emergency response operations, law enforcement and corrections officers are vulnerable to heat strokes or hyperthermia. The Occupational Safety and Health Administration in the United States publishes a heat stress "Quick Card", that contains a checklist designed to help prevent heat stress. To protect users from heat stress, blunt trauma PPE can allow air flows underneath the suit to maximize the body's natural cooling process of perspiration. With good air ventilation, the suit will help cool the user and reduce excess body heat which can contribute to heat stress.

== See also ==
- Blunt trauma
- Riot control
- Stab vest
- Personal protective equipment
