= Geriatric trauma =

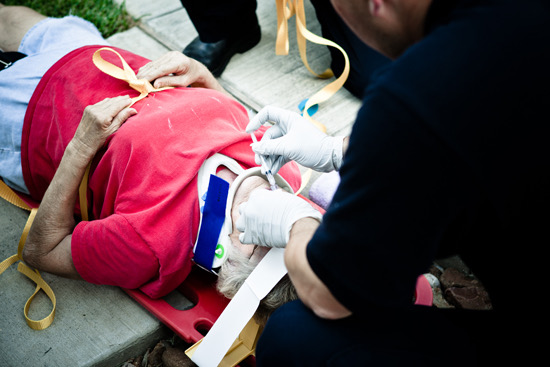
- Medical personnel attend to geriatric trauma patient.
- Specialty: Emergency medicine

Geriatric trauma refers to a traumatic injury that occurs to an elderly person. People around the world are living longer than ever. In developed and underdeveloped countries, the pace of population aging is increasing. By 2050, the world's population aged 60 years and older is expected to total 2 billion, up from 900 million in 2015. While this trend presents opportunities for productivity and additional experiences, it also comes with its own set of challenges for health systems. More so than ever, elderly populations are presenting to the Emergency Department following traumatic injury. In addition, given advances in the management of chronic illnesses, more elderly adults are living active lifestyles and are at risk of traumatic injury. In the United States, this population accounts for 14% of all traumatic injuries, of which a majority are just mainly from falls.

Trauma is a leading cause of morbidity and mortality across all age groups, however, geriatric populations are unique compared to younger counterparts in the amount of existing health issues and inherent risk of disability and death. As a whole, older populations are more vulnerable to trauma from minor mechanisms of injury and less able to recover following injury. At the same time, medications to manage existing chronic conditions and co-morbidities may negatively affect older adults’ physiological responses to traumatic injuries and increase the risk for complications later on.

== Risk factors ==
=== Biomechanics of injury ===
A progressive decline in central nervous system function leads to a loss of proprioception, balance and overall motor coordination, as well as a reduction in eye–hand coordination, reaction time and an unsteady gait. These degenerative changes are often accompanied by osteoarthritis (degenerative joint disease), which leads to a reduction in the range of motion of the head, neck and extremities. Furthermore, elderly people frequently take multiple medications for control of various diseases and conditions. The side effects of some of these medications may either predispose to injury, or may cause a minor trauma to result in a much more severe condition. For example, a person taking warfarin (Coumadin) and/or clopidogrel (Plavix) may experience a life-threatening intracranial hemorrhage after sustaining a relatively minor closed head injury, as a result of the defect in the hemostatic mechanism caused by such medications. The combined effects of these changes greatly predisposes elderly people to traumatic injury. Both the incidence of falls and the severity of associated complications increase with advancing age.

=== Physiologic differences in the elderly ===
Virtually all organ systems experience a progressive decline in function as a result of the aging process. One example is a decline in circulatory system function caused in part by thickening of the cardiac muscle. This can lead to congestive heart failure or pulmonary edema. Another example is the decline in muscle mass, which although highly variable among individuals, rapidly speeds up in older age and can decreases up to 50% when compared to the weight of the individual. This loss of muscle mass can compromise the elderly adult's ability to maintain a straight posture.

Atrophy of the brain begins to accelerate at around seventy years of age, which leads to a significant reduction in brain mass. Since the skull does not decrease in size with the brain, there is significant space between the two when this occurs which puts the elderly at a higher risk of a subdural hematoma after sustaining a closed head injury. The reduction of brain size can lead to issues with eyesight, cognition and hearing.

=== Falls ===
Because falls are the most common mechanism of injury in severely injured geriatric patients, the risk factors for geriatric trauma overlap significantly with those that predispose older adults to falls. Falls may often be described as “mechanical” or “non-mechanical.” A “mechanical fall” implies that an object or force in the patient's external environment caused the fall to occur. However, the use of this term may result in a failure to conduct a thorough evaluation of intrinsic factors related to the fall. Even in cases of community-dwelling older adults experiencing falls related to slipping, tripping, or stumbling, the patients’ co-morbidities and health status are often involved. In addition, a proportion of patients with reported “non-mechanical falls” have been shown to have environmental factors. For this reason, it is crucial to consider the interactions between environmental hazards and increased individual susceptibility from the accumulated effects of intrinsic risk factors when evaluating why a fall occurred in an older adult.

From a meta-analysis examining risk factors for falls in both community-dwelling and institutionalized populations, the most common intrinsic determinants of falls risks include:

- Lower extremity weakness due to limited physical activity and muscle atrophy, and chronic conditions like cardiovascular disease and diabetes
- A prior history of falls
- Gait and balance deficits
- Visual deficits, which may occur due to cataracts, glaucoma, or macular degeneration
- Arthritis
- Impaired functionality and loss of ability to complete activities of daily living
- Depression
- Cognitive impairment from dementia

Other important intrinsic risk factors for falls indicated by other studies include peripheral nerve dysfunction with postural instability, use of sedatives, hypnotics, antidepressants, benzodiazepines, and vasodilators, and history of problem drinking.

Lastly, in one study, home modifications like adding handrails for outside and inside stairs, grab rails for bathrooms, outdoor lighting, and slip-resistant floors was shown to cause a 26% reduction in the rate of injuries caused by falls at home per year compared to a control group without these interventions. This demonstrates the value in creating a more accommodating and safe home environment for a community-dwelling elder, especially if they have several intrinsic risk factors for falls. Another study found a lower risk of falls associated with wearing athletic shoes and canvas shoes compared to other types of footwear including slippers, sandals, and high heels.

=== Motor Vehicle Crashes ===
Motor vehicle crashes are the second most frequent mechanism of injury to explain trauma in older adults. Risk factors that affect driving performance in older adults include:

- A history of falls in the past two years. This may be attributable to falling and crashing sharing highly similar risk factors.
- Visual deficits. One study demonstrated that older adults who possessed shrinkage in the useful field of view were six times more likely to have incurred one or more crashes in the last five years. Other parameters of eye function like eye health status and visual sensory function were correlated with crashes.
- Cognitive deficits. One study used a road test in California consisting of a six-stage driving course with typical intersections, merging roads, curves, crosswalks, etc. to compare the driving capabilities of participants with cognitive impairments and healthy controls. They found significantly worse drive scores in participants with mild Alzheimer's disease and vascular dementia compared to older and young control groups.
- A history of motor vehicle crashes in the past five years.
- Psychotropic medications with central nervous system effects, including benzodiazepines, SSRIs, and opioids.
- Age-associated medical conditions like stroke or transient ischemic attack, glaucoma, and Parkinson's disease.

=== Burns ===
Although the survivability of burn injuries continues to improve across all age groups, this improvement may be less for older burn victims. This observation may be attributable to a greater degree of co-morbidities and slow wound healing that result in an increased length of stay and higher mortality in the elderly compared to patients less than 60 years. Therefore, it is important to recognize and address risk factors that predispose older adults to burns.

Factors that increase the risk of incurring burn injury in older adults include:

- Residence in homes with substandard fire safety features, including absent or non-functional smoke detectors, absent fire extinguishers, and water temperature greater than the recommended maximum of 120 °F.
- Residence in mobile homes or older homes in rural or central urban areas.
- Hearing impairment, resulting in an inability to hear a triggered smoke alarm.
- Mobility impairment, preventing or slowing escape from a house fire.
- Smoking and alcohol consumption.
- Dementia, decreased dexterity, poor sensorimotor perception, sedative medication, and malnutrition.

=== Elder Abuse ===
Geriatric trauma may be caused by elder physical, emotional, or sexual abuse, resulting in an increased risk of death at the end of a 13-year follow-up period in one study. According to a published uniform definition from the National Center for Injury Prevention and Control, Division of Violence Prevention, elder abuse is “an intentional act or failure to act by a caregiver or another person in a relationship involving an expectation of trust that causes or creates a risk of harm to an older adult.”

To prevent or identify patients who may experience elder abuse, it is crucial to identify which older adults are at an increased risk. Some findings correlated with risk of elder mistreatment are presented below:

- Loneliness. Loneliness is an indicator of social well-being and can lead to intense feelings of emptiness and serious health consequences, including depressive symptoms and cognitive decline. Importantly, when manifested in older adults, it may reflect increased vulnerability and dependency, which may provide circumstances under which elder mistreatment can occur. Isolation reduces the likelihood that abuse will be detected and stopped. Feelings of loneliness are independently associated with self-reported elder mistreatment.
- Functional impairment. One study demonstrated that greater functional impairment was associated with an increased risk of emotional and physical abuse. This may be related to increased vulnerability because older adults with impaired ability to perform ADLs/IADLs have a reduced capacity to defend themselves or escape escalating mistreatment.
- Separated and divorced marital status. These individuals may be more likely to have unstable, conflictive family relationships that increase the risk of mistreatment.
- Lower income or poverty. Low economic resources may serve as a situational stressor contributing to elder mistreatment.
- Characteristics of abusers. Elders often share a living arrangement with their abuser. Relatives that are more likely to become abusive include those with mental illness, substance use disorders, dependence on the elder for financial assistance and housing, and a history of violence in contexts outside the family.
- Depression and dementia. Both have been demonstrated as related to elder abuse and neglect. They may cause a loss of capacity for self-care and protection.

== Types of Injuries ==
Falls and motor vehicle crashes are the most common types of injuries among geriatric adults. As a whole, older populations are more vulnerable to mortality from all causes of trauma given that they are less able to compensate following injury.

Falls account for three-quarters of all trauma in this population. In one review, the estimated probability of falling at least once in any given year for individuals 65 years and older was 27%. One out of five falls causes a serious injury such as broken bones or a head injury. In the United States, over 800,000 patients a year are hospitalized because of a fall injury, most often because of a head injury or hip fracture.

Motor vehicle crashes are the second most common mechanism of injury among geriatric adults, and the most common cause of traumatic mortality. Of the possible injuries, older adults are especially at risk of chest injuries (such as rib fractures) which may negatively interact with existing cardiopulmonary comorbidities—increasing the risk of complications like pneumonia and respiratory failure. In addition, the highest mortality rate in geriatric trauma is among older pedestrians struck by a vehicle.

Burns are also especially dangerous in geriatric populations. Relating back to physiology, comorbidities and slow wound healing can result in an increase length of stay, and higher mortality in the elderly compared to patients less than 60 yr of age.

=== Falls ===
Falls are the most common cause of injury in older adults. According to the Behavior Risk Factor Surveillance System in 2018, approximately 28 percent of individuals over 65 years old reported a fall within the last year. This would account for approximately 36 million falls, of which approximately 8.4 million resulted in injuries. These falls are often underreported and can significantly threaten the individual's independence.

Every year, about 5 percent of falls result in hospitalizations in the geriatric population. These injuries lead to an increase in morbidity and a greater likelihood that they will be admitted to a nursing home. Approximately 95 percent of all hip fractures reported are due to an unforeseen fall and 25-75 percent of those do not recover fully to the mobility they had prior to the fall. Of those older adults who fall, only about half are able to stand back up on their own, the other half experience a “long lie” which makes them more likely to experience a steeper decline on their activities of daily living than those who are able to stand back up on their own. Furthermore, the medical complications arising from these falls make it so that they become the leading cause of death from injury in populations over 65 years old and fifth overall cause of death.

As a result of a fall, older adults can also experience post-fall anxiety syndrome. This fear of falling was present in 60 percent of community dwelling geriatric populations, and was demonstrated by their reduction in levels of activity; 15 percent of which severely restricted their mobility out of fear of having another fall. This further contributes to morbidity because it can contribute to cognitive impairment, depression, isolation, increase in rates of obesity, and further mobility impairment.

=== Burns ===
The geriatric population is at increased risk for burn injury. While geriatric burns account for less than 5% of burns in developing countries, nearly 20% of burns in developed countries are experienced by the geriatric population. These burn injuries tend to occur at home—particularly in the kitchen or the bathroom—and most commonly consist of flame and scald burns.

Importantly, geriatric patients are at increased risk for downstream complications. This is in part due to limited mobility, decreased ability to react rapidly to threats, and pre-existing medical problems such as vision impairment and medication side effects. Additionally, due to the natural processes of aging, the skin of geriatric patients has impaired mechanisms to protect against burns, including impaired neurosensory sensitivity, skin permeability, and regeneration capacity. These impairments lead to deeper wounds, prolonged wound healing, and lower potential for complete recovery.

==== Treatment Implications ====
Fluid resuscitation and pain control are key components of burn treatment. In the geriatric population, extra care must be paid to provide appropriate fluids, as age is significantly associated with increased volume requirement in the first 48 hours post-injury. Additionally, geriatric patients are often not provided with adequate pain control management, in part due to a misconception that pain decreases with age (there is no evidence to support this claim). Appropriate pain management is critical for recovery, and must consider patients' co-morbidities, organ functions, and current medications.

Skin-grafting is another important form of treatment for burns. However, age is a risk factor for unsuccessful grafting due to the natural thinning of the skin that occurs with age. Other risk factors for failed skin relevant to the geriatric population for unsuccessful skin grafting include being over age 55, peripheral vascular disease, diabetes mellitus, and related problems of limb ischemia.

==== Outcomes ====
Studies suggest that few geriatric patients return to their previous state of health following burn injury. Long-term consequences in this population include exacerbation of pre-existing conditions, decreased mobility, loss of independence, worsened nutrition, pain, and psychological sequelae including depression.

== Trauma Team Activation ==
One significant problem in the acute assessment of geriatric trauma patients is under-triage. Trauma team activation (TTA) must be done liberally due to limited costs and resources. Therefore, the criteria for TTA is established by the American College of Surgeons and individual trauma centers. The criteria used to identify patients with a greater need for high level care include vital signs (systolic blood pressure below 90 mmHg or heart rate above 120 bpm), level of consciousness, and mechanism of injury. However, elderly patients with severe trauma often do not meet the standard TTA criteria due to normal age-related changes and reduced physiologic capacities. For example, older adults have a less profound tachycardic response to hemorrhage, pain, or anxiety following trauma. This explains why mortality increases in the elderly above a heart rate of 90 bpm, an association not observed until heart rate of 130 bpm in younger patients. Similarly, in older adults, systemic vascular resistance is increased, which may result in baseline hypertension. In the setting of shock, expected declines in blood pressure may not occur, leading to misinterpretation of the geriatric patient's condition. This supports why mortality significantly increases with systolic blood pressure below 110 mmHg in older adults but not until 95 mmHg in younger patients. This is why several centers and studies support using older age as a TTA criterion as a means to reduce mortality in this population, regardless of the mechanism of injury.

== See also ==
- Senescence
- Gerontology
- Elder abuse
