= Transmediastinal gunshot wound =

Gunshot injury to the chest

A transmediastinal gunshot wound (TMGSW) is a penetrating injury to a person's thorax in which a bullet enters the mediastinum, possibly damaging some of the major structures in this area. Hemodynamic instability has been reported in about 50% of cases with a mortality rate ranging from 20% to 49%. Some studies have shown marked improvement in the mortality rate of patients who survived transfer to the operating room rather than being treated surgically in the ER.

== Presentation ==
=== Complications ===
Complications caused by a TMGSW can range from mild to life-threatening depending on which structures are damaged. It can be rapidly lethal if a major structure is involved. Some of the possible complications caused by a TMGSW are:

- damage to great vessels such as the vena cava, aorta, pulmonary arteries
- damage to cardiac muscle
- massive hemorrhage
- cardiac tamponade
- hemomediastinum
- pneumomediastinum
- neurologic injury
- In many cases, pneumothorax or hemothorax occurs due to the proximity of the lungs to the mediastinum.

== Diagnosis ==
=== Stable patients ===
Previously, every stable patient who suffered a TMGSW received extensive evaluation that included chest radiography, oesophagography, esophagoscopy, angiography, bronchoscopy, or cardiac ultrasound. Grossman et al. found evidence that the trajectory of the bullet can be delineated with the use of computed tomographic scan (CT). Subsequently, other studies demonstrated the use of CT as a screening tool for stable patients who suffered TMGSW is a reliable tool for ruling out, diagnosing, and avoiding missed injuries. For example, Stassen et al. showed data of 22 stable patients who were screened with CT, chest X-ray and abdominal ultrasound; seven patients showed a positive CT scan and required additional evaluation, and of these seven patients, three required surgical management. Additionally the work of Burack et al., whose evaluation of stable patients with penetrating injuries to the mediastinum — this time including stab wounds — relied mostly on CT and ultrasound, showed similar results. The work of Ibirogba et al. did so, as well. Recent data suggest that the use of CT scan with some additional noninvasive techniques, such as ultrasound and chest roentgenogram, are reliable screening tools to decide whether patients need further evaluation.

=== Unstable patients ===
The criteria to define a patient as stable or unstable could have variations from institution to institution. For example, Burack et al. used a list of six criteria in his paper that defined an unstable hemodynamic state:

1. Traumatic cardiac arrest (asystole, course or fine ventricular fibrillation, pulseless electrical activity, or pulseless ventricular tachycardia) or near arrest (unstable ventricular tachycardia with a pulse, or bradycardia with a pulse) and an emergency department chest incision- thoracotomy
2. Cardiac tamponade
3. Persistent ATLS class III shock despite fluid resuscitation (blood loss 1500–2000 mL, pulse rate greater than 120, blood pressure decreased)
4. Chest tube output greater than 1500 mL of blood on insertion
5. Chest tube output greater than 500 mL/hour for the initial hour
6. Massive hemothorax after chest tube drainage

One common criteria found in literature is a sustained systolic blood pressure of less than 100 mmHg, but this can be an oversimplification. Patients with clinical evidence of possible TMGSW that are considered unstable receive no further evaluation and are taken to surgery immediately.

== Management ==
=== Stable ===
Stable patients are evaluated with CT, ultrasound, and/or chest X-ray as the institution's protocol specifies. When this initial survey is negative, patients can be observed with conservative management. In many cases, chest tubes are required due to concomitant lesions in the pleural cavity. If possible lesions are found (for example, a missile track near the trachea or esophagus, or pneumomediastinum), further investigation follows with oesophagography, esophagoscopy, angiography, or bronchoscopy as needed to rule out or confirm such a lesion, and decide whether surgical repair is warranted.

=== Unstable ===
Unstable patients are managed by operative exploration of the mediastinum. Moribund patients go through an emergency department thoracotomy. This measure is taken because at their arrival in the emergency room, these patients are in such critical condition that they would not survive long enough to be transferred to an operating room. Outcome is very poor. Burack et al. reported only 2.8% survival of such patients in his study. In a study by Van Waes et al., (which included all thoracic-penetrating injuries, not just transmediastinal) survival after emergency department thoracotomy was 25%. In other circumstances the unstable patient is immediately transferred to the operating room for exploration by thoracotomy or sternotomy. Survival rate has been reported as high as 75 percent when the patient is able to reach the OR.
