= Useful field of view =

In human vision, the useful field of view (or UFOV) is the portion of the field of view from which information can be extracted without eye or head movements. UFOV size generally decreases with age, most likely due to decreases in visual processing speed, reduced perception, and difficulty ignoring distraction. UFOV performance is correlated with important real-world issues, including risk of an automobile crash. Performance can be improved by computer-based training.:

== History ==
UFOV assessment and training programs were primarily developed by Karlene Ball of the University of Alabama at Birmingham, and Daniel Roenker of Western Kentucky University. The first versions of the assessment and training programs were produced at Northwestern University by Robert Sekuler and Ball. These programs were originally made available through Visual Awareness Inc.

== Assessment ==
The traditional UFOV assessment is a computer-based visual test containing three subtests.

- Processing Speed: Determines threshold for discriminating stimuli presented in central vision.
- Divided Attention: Same as 1, but with the addition of a concurrent peripheral target location task.
- Selective Attention: Same as 2 but with the addition of distracters.

The threshold scores are combined to produce an overall performance score.

Note: UFOV is not the same as a visual field or perimetry test that examines the ability of the visual system to process light falling on various regions of the retina. Perimetry tests check for the integrity of the visual system while UFOV tests the ability to pay attention to the information in the visual field particularly when under situations of increased demand for attention.

== Impact ==
Performance on the UFOV assessment is correlated with several real-world functions:

- Several studies have shown that a reduction in UFOV is correlated with an increased risk of an automobile accident, with poor performers about twice as likely to have an automobile crash as good performers.
- Drivers with poor UFOV performance take longer to cross intersections and initiate crossing later.
- The UFOV assessment is one of the best visual or cognitive predictors of crash rates, surpassing visual acuity tests (used at most Department of Motor Vehicle test sites).
- Poor UFOV performers have more collisions during obstacle navigation while walking.
- People with poor UFOV performance have higher rates of falls causing injuries.

== Cognitive Speed of Processing Training ==
Performance can be improved by computer-based training. Multiple studies have shown that improved UFOV performance generalizes to several real-world functions. UFOV training has been shown to:

- Reduce dangerous driving maneuvers by 36% when measured 18 months following training. The same study showed faster reaction times equating to an additional 22 feet more stopping distance at 55 mph.
- Reduce at-fault automobile crashes by 51% in the five-year period following training.
- Reduce the risk of driving cessation by 40%.
- Help maintain driving distance and driving in difficult situations such as in the dark, in rain, and rush hour traffic and prolongs safe driving mobility.
- Reduce the risk of serious health-related quality of life decline measured at 2 and 5 years.
- Reduce subsequent annual predicted medical care expenditures at one year (by $244) and five years (by $143 p.a.).
- Reduce decline in instrumental activities of daily living measured at 5 yrs post UFOV training.
- Reduce the risk of the onset of clinically significant depression symptoms by 38% measured at 1-year follow-up.
- Improve performance on timed activities of daily living, such as reading medicine instructions, counting change, looking up a phone number, and finding items in a cupboard.
- Increased ability to identify lexical information in older adults.
