= Blunt trauma =

Trauma to the body without penetration of the skin

- Other names: Blunt injury, non-penetrating trauma, trauma
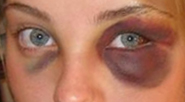
- A person with a black eye
- Symptoms: bruising, occasionally complicated as hypoxia, ventilation-perfusion mismatch, hypovolemia, reduced cardiac output

A blunt trauma, also known as a blunt force trauma or non-penetrating trauma, is a physical trauma due to a forceful impact without penetration of the body's surface. Blunt trauma stands in contrast with penetrating trauma, which occurs when an object pierces the skin, enters body tissue, and creates an open wound. Blunt trauma occurs due to direct physical trauma or impactful force to a body part. Such incidents often occur with road traffic collisions, assaults, and sports-related injuries, and are common among the elderly who experience falls.

Blunt trauma can lead to a wide range of injuries including bruises, concussions, scrapes, cuts, internal or external bleeding, and bone fractures. The severity of these injuries depends on factors such as the force of the impact, the area of the body affected, and any underlying medical conditions of the affected individual. In some cases, blunt force trauma can be life-threatening and may require immediate medical attention. Blunt trauma to the head and/or severe blood loss are the most likely causes of death due to blunt force traumatic injury.

== Classification ==
=== Blunt abdominal trauma ===
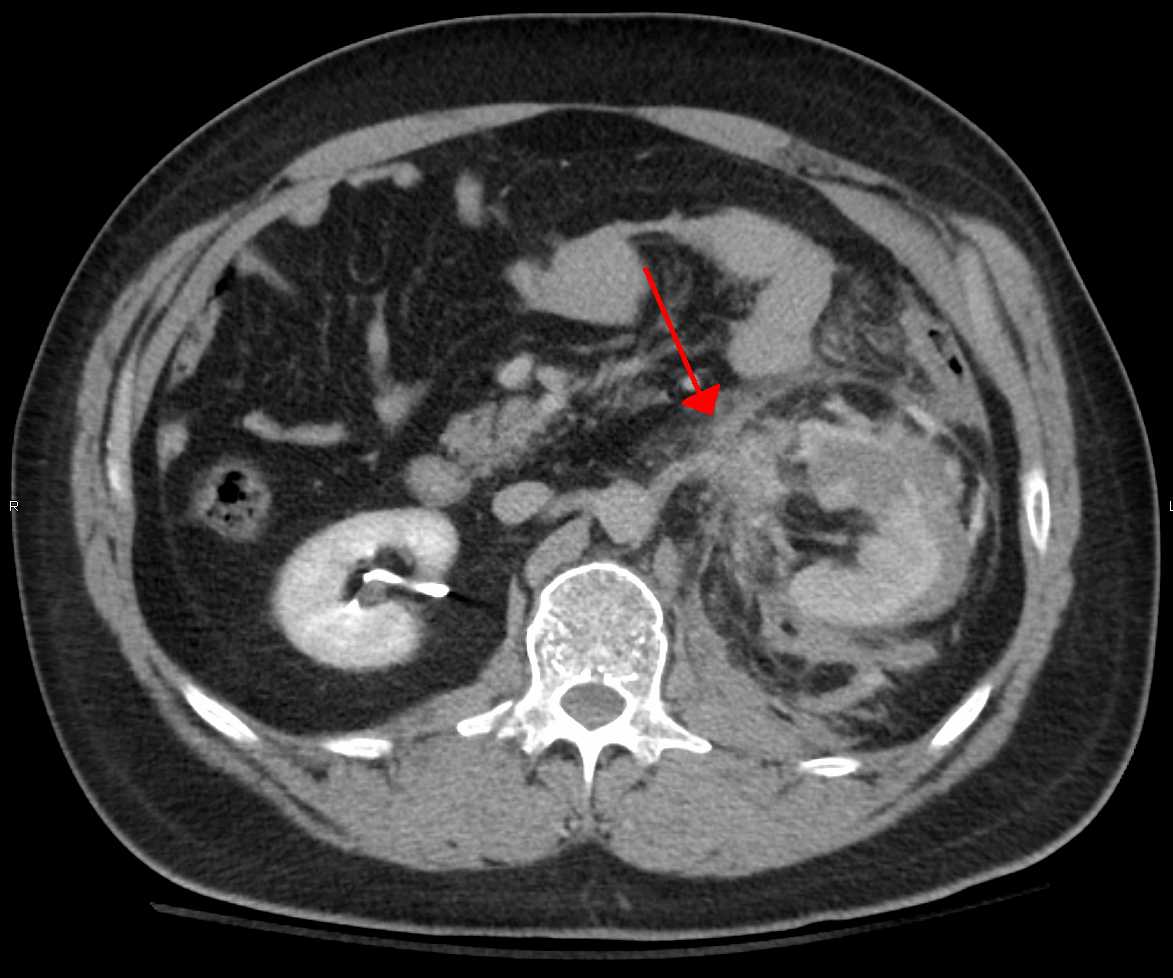
Abdominal CT showing left renal artery injury

Blunt abdominal trauma (BAT) represents 75% of all blunt trauma and is the most common example of this injury. Seventy-five percent of BAT occurs in motor vehicle crashes, in which rapid deceleration may propel the driver into the steering wheel, dashboard, or seatbelt, causing contusions in less serious cases, or rupture of internal organs from briefly increased intraluminal pressure in the more serious, depending on the force applied. Initially, there may be few indications that serious internal abdominal injury has occurred, making assessment more challenging and requiring a high degree of clinical suspicion.

There are two basic physical mechanisms at play with the potential of injury to intra-abdominal organs: compression and deceleration. The former occurs from a direct blow, such as a punch, or compression against a non-yielding object such as a seat belt or steering column. This force may deform a hollow organ, increasing its intraluminal or internal pressure and possibly leading to rupture.

Deceleration, on the other hand, causes stretching and shearing at the points where mobile contents in the abdomen, like the bowel, are anchored. This can cause tearing of the mesentery of the bowel and injury to the blood vessels that travel within the mesentery. Classic examples of these mechanisms are a hepatic tear along the ligamentum teres and injuries to the renal arteries.

When blunt abdominal trauma is complicated by 'internal injury,' the liver and spleen (see blunt splenic trauma) are most frequently involved, followed by the small intestine.

In rare cases, this injury has been attributed to medical techniques such as the Heimlich maneuver, attempts at CPR and manual thrusts to clear an airway. Although these are rare examples, it has been suggested that they are caused by applying excessive pressure when performing these life-saving techniques. Finally, the occurrence of splenic rupture with mild blunt abdominal trauma in those recovering from infectious mononucleosis or 'mono' (also known as 'glandular fever' in non-U.S. countries, specifically the UK) is well reported.

==== Blunt abdominal trauma in sports ====
The supervised environment in which most sports injuries occur allows for mild deviations from the traditional trauma treatment algorithms, such as ATLS, due to the greater precision in identifying the mechanism of injury. The priority in assessing blunt trauma in sports injuries is separating contusions and musculo-tendinous injuries from injuries to solid organs and the gut. It is also crucial to recognize the potential for developing blood loss and to react accordingly. Blunt injuries to the kidney from helmets, shoulder pads, and knees are described in American football, association football, martial arts, and all-terrain vehicle crashes.

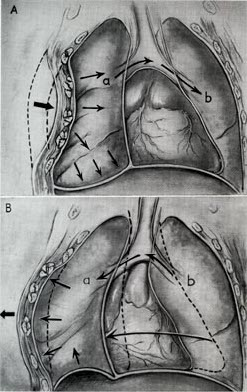
A depiction of flail chest, a very serious blunt chest injury

=== Blunt thoracic trauma ===
The term blunt thoracic trauma, or, more informally, blunt chest injury, encompasses a variety of injuries to the chest. Broadly, this also includes damage caused by direct blunt force (such as a fist or a bat in an assault), acceleration or deceleration (such as that from a rear-end automotive crash), shear force (a combination of acceleration and deceleration), compression (such as a heavy object falling on a person), and blasts (such as an explosion of some sort). Common signs and symptoms include something as simple as bruising, but occasionally as complicated as hypoxia, ventilation-perfusion mismatch, hypovolemia, and reduced cardiac output due to the way the thoracic organs may have been affected. Blunt thoracic trauma is not always visible from the outside and such internal injuries may not show signs or symptoms at the time the trauma initially occurs or even until hours after. A high degree of clinical suspicion may sometimes be required to identify such injuries, a CT scan may prove useful in such instances. Those experiencing more obvious complications from a blunt chest injury will likely undergo a focused assessment with sonography for trauma (FAST) which can reliably detect a significant amount of blood around the heart or in the lung by using a special machine that visualizes sound waves sent through the body. Only 10–15% of thoracic traumas require surgery, but they can have serious impacts on the heart, lungs, and great vessels.

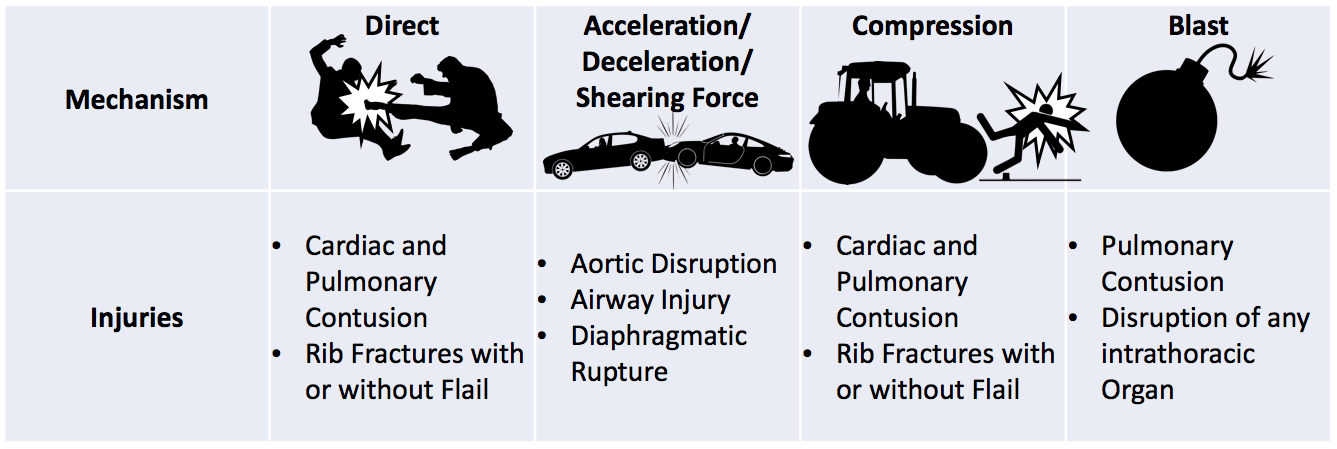
This table depicts mechanisms of blunt thoracic trauma and the most common injuries from each mechanism.

The most immediate life-threatening injuries that may occur include tension pneumothorax, open pneumothorax, hemothorax, flail chest, cardiac tamponade, and airway obstruction/rupture.

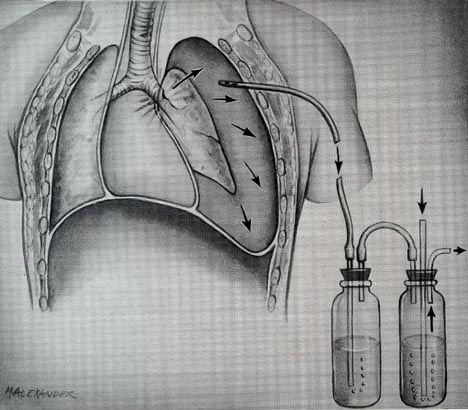
An example of a chest tube

The injuries may necessitate a procedure, most commonly the insertion of an intercostal drain, or chest tube. This tube is typically installed because it helps restore a certain balance in pressures (usually due to misplaced air or surrounding blood) that are impeding the lungs' ability to inflate and thus exchange vital gases that allow the body to function. A less common procedure that may be employed is a pericardiocentesis, which, by removing blood surrounding the heart, permits the heart to regain some ability to appropriately pump blood. In certain dire circumstances an emergent thoracotomy may be employed.

=== Blunt cranial trauma ===
The primary clinical concern with blunt trauma to the head is damage to the brain, although other structures, including the skull, face, orbits, and neck are also at risk. Following assessment of the patient's airway, circulation, and breathing, a cervical collar may be placed if there is suspicion of trauma to the neck. Evaluation of blunt trauma to the head continues with the secondary survey for evidence of cranial trauma, including bruises, contusions, lacerations, and abrasions. In addition to noting external injury, a comprehensive neurologic exam is typically performed to assess for damage to the brain. Depending on the mechanism of injury and examination, a CT scan of the skull and brain may be ordered. This is typically done to assess for blood within the skull or fracture of the skull bones.

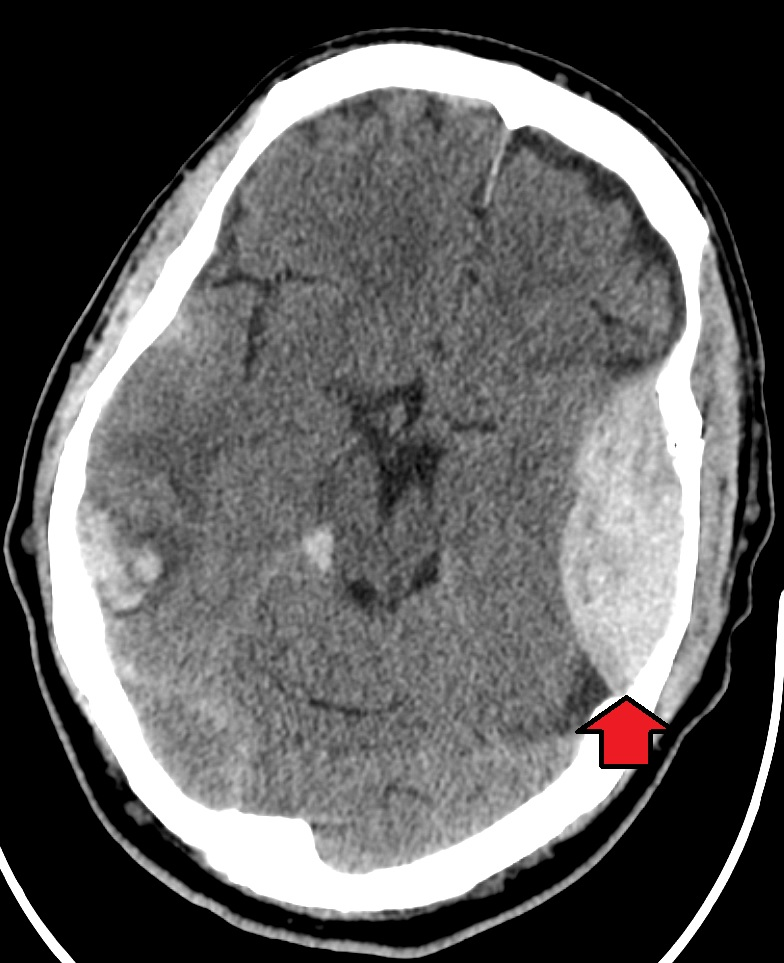
A CT scan showing an epidural hematoma, a variety of intracranial bleeding commonly associated with blunt trauma to the temple region

==== Traumatic brain injury (TBI) ====
Traumatic brain injury (TBI) is a significant cause of morbidity and mortality and is most commonly caused by falls, motor vehicle crashes, sports- and work-related injuries, and assaults. It is the most common cause of death in patients under the age of 25. TBI is graded from mild to severe, with greater severity correlating with increased morbidity and mortality.

Most patients with more severe traumatic brain injury have a combination of intracranial injuries, which can include diffuse axonal injury, cerebral contusions, and intracranial bleeding, including subarachnoid hemorrhage, subdural hematoma, epidural hematoma, and intraparenchymal hemorrhage. The recovery of brain function following a traumatic injury is highly variable and depends upon the specific intracranial injuries that occur. However, there is a significant correlation between the severity of the initial insult as well as the level of neurologic function during the initial assessment and the level of lasting neurologic deficits. Initial treatment may be targeted at reducing the intracranial pressure if there is concern for swelling or bleeding within the skull. This may require surgery, such as a hemicraniectomy, in which part of the skull is removed.

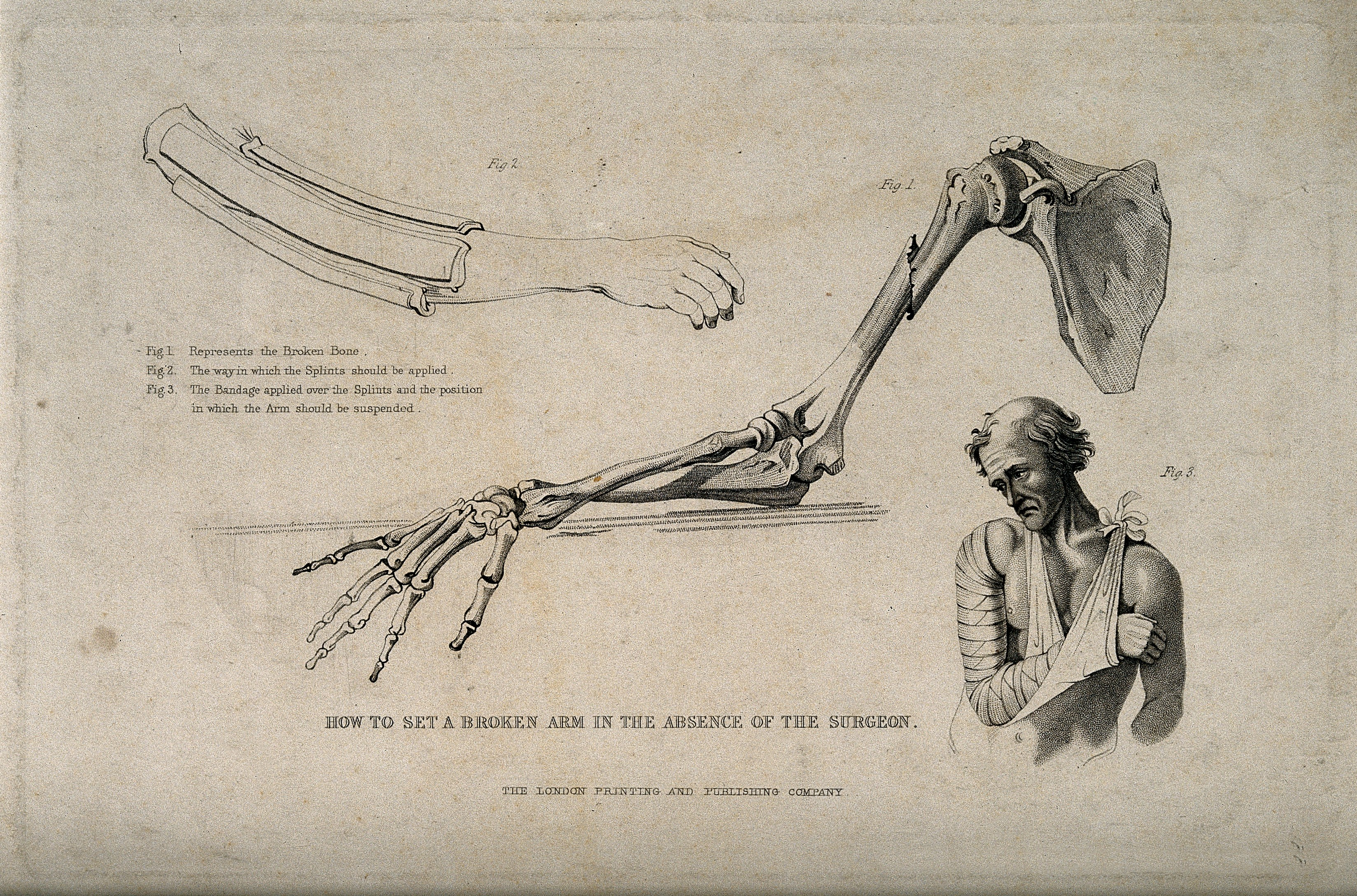
A fracture, an injury to the skeletal component of the upper extremity

=== Blunt trauma to extremities ===
The Ankle-Brachial Index is depicted here. Note: ultrasound enhancement of pulses is not required but may be helpful.

Injury to extremities (like arms, legs, hands, feet) is extremely common. Falls are the most common etiology, making up as much as 30% of upper and 60% of lower extremity injuries. The most common mechanism for solely upper extremity injuries is machine operation or tool use. Work-related accidents and vehicle crashes are also common causes. The injured extremity is examined for four major functional components which include soft tissues, nerves, vessels, and bones. Vessels are examined for expanding hematoma, bruit, distal pulse exam, and signs/symptoms of ischemia, essentially asking, "Does blood seem to be getting through the injured area in a way that enough is getting to the parts past the injury?" When it is not obvious that the answer is "yes", an injured extremity index or ankle-brachial index may be used to help guide whether further evaluation with computed tomography arteriography. This uses a special scanner and a substance that makes it easier to examine the vessels in finer detail than what the human hand can feel or the human eye can see. Soft tissue damage can lead to rhabdomyolysis (a rapid breakdown of injured muscle that can overwhelm the kidneys) or may potentially develop compartment syndrome (when pressure builds up in muscle compartments damages the nerves and vessels in the same compartment). Bones are evaluated with plain film X-ray or computed tomography if deformity (misshapen), bruising, or joint laxity (looser or more flexible than usual) are observed. Neurologic evaluation involves testing the major nerve functions of the axillary, radial, and median nerves in the upper extremity as well as the femoral, sciatic, deep peroneal, and tibial nerves in the lower extremity. Depending on the extent of injury and involved structures, surgical treatment may be necessary, but many are managed nonoperatively.

=== Blunt pelvic trauma ===
The most common causes of blunt pelvic trauma are motor vehicle crashes and multiple-story falls, and thus pelvic injuries are commonly associated with additional traumatic injuries in other locations. In the pelvis specifically, the structures at risk include the pelvic bones, the proximal femur, major blood vessels such as the iliac arteries, the urinary tract, reproductive organs, and the rectum.

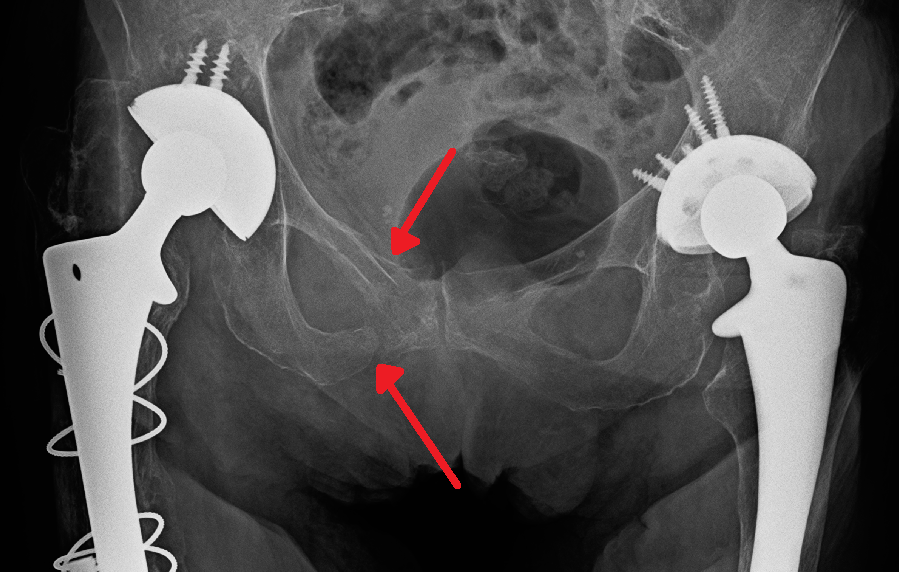
An X-ray showing a fracture of the inferior and superior pubic rami in a patient with previous hip replacements

One of the primary concerns is the risk of pelvic fracture, which itself is associated with a myriad of complications including bleeding, damage to the urethra and bladder, and nerve damage. If pelvic trauma is suspected, emergency medical services personnel may place a pelvic binder on patients to stabilize the patient's pelvis and prevent further damage to these structures while patients are transported to a hospital. During the evaluation of trauma patients in an emergency department, the stability of the pelvis is typically assessed by the healthcare provider to determine whether a fracture may have occurred. Providers may then decide to order imaging such as an X-ray or CT scan to detect fractures; however, if there is concern for life-threatening bleeding, patients should receive an X-ray of the pelvis. Following initial treatment of the patient, fractures may need to be treated surgically if significant, while some minor fractures may heal without requiring surgery.

A life-threatening concern is hemorrhage, which may result from damage to the aorta, iliac arteries, or veins in the pelvis. The majority of bleeding due to pelvic trauma is due to injury to the veins. Fluid (often blood) may be detected in the pelvis via ultrasound during the FAST scan that is often performed following traumatic injuries. Should a patient appear hemodynamically unstable in the absence of obvious blood on the FAST scan, there may be concern for bleeding into the retroperitoneal space, known as retroperitoneal hematoma. Stopping the bleeding may require endovascular intervention or surgery, depending on the location and severity.

=== Blunt cardiac trauma ===
Blunt cardiac trauma, also known as Blunt Cardiac Injury (BCI), encompasses a spectrum of cardiac injuries resulting from blunt force trauma to the chest. While BCIs necessitate a substantial amount of force to occur because the heart is well-protected by the rib cage and sternum, the majority of patients are asymptomatic. Clinical presentations may range from minor, clinically insignificant changes to heartbeat or may progress to severe cardiac failure and death. Oftentimes, chest wall injuries are seen in conjunction with BCI, which confounds the presence of chest pain experienced by most patients. To evaluate the spectrum of cardiac injury, the American Association for the Surgery of Trauma (AAST) organ injury scale may be used to aid in determining the extent of the injury (see Evaluation and Diagnosis below). BCI may be broken down into pericardial injury, valvular injuries, coronary artery injuries, cardiac chamber rupture, and myocardial contusion.

== Evaluation and diagnosis ==
In most settings, the initial evaluation and stabilization of traumatic injury follows the same general principles of identifying and treating immediately life-threatening injuries. In the US, the American College of Surgeons publishes the Advanced Trauma Life Support guidelines, which provide a step-by-step approach to the initial assessment, stabilization, diagnostic reasoning, and treatment of traumatic injuries that codifies this general principle. The assessment typically begins by ensuring that the subject's airway is open and competent, that breathing is unlabored, and that circulation—i.e. pulses that can be felt—is present. This is sometimes described as the "A, B, C's"—Airway, Breathing, and Circulation—and is the first step in any resuscitation or triage. Then, the history of the accident or injury is amplified with any medical, dietary (timing of last oral intake) and history, from whatever sources that might be available such as family, friends, and previous treating physicians. This method is sometimes given the mnemonic "SAMPLE". The amount of time spent on diagnosis should be minimized and expedited by a combination of clinical assessment and appropriate use of technology, such as diagnostic peritoneal lavage (DPL), or bedside ultrasound examination (FAST) before proceeding to laparotomy if required. If time and the patient's stability permit, a CT examination may be carried out if available. Its advantages include superior definition of the injury, leading to grading of the injury and sometimes the confidence to avoid or postpone surgery. Its disadvantages include the time taken to acquire images, although this gets shorter with each generation of scanners, and the removal of the patient from the immediate view of the emergency or surgical staff. Many providers use the aid of an algorithm such as the ATLS guidelines to determine which images to obtain following the initial assessment. These algorithms take into account the mechanism of injury, physical examination, and patient's vital signs to determine whether patients should have imaging or proceed directly to surgery.

In 2011, criteria were defined that might allow patients with blunt abdominal trauma to be discharged safely without further evaluation. The characteristics of such patients include:

- absence of intoxication
- no evidence of lowered blood pressure or raised pulse rate
- no abdominal pain or tenderness
- no blood in the urine.

To be considered low-risk, patients would need to meet all low-risk criteria.

== Treatment ==
When blunt trauma is significant enough to require evaluation by a healthcare provider, treatment is typically aimed at treating life-threatening injuries, such as maintaining the patient's airway and preventing ongoing blood loss. Patients who have suffered blunt trauma and meet specific triage criteria have shown improved outcomes when they are cared for in a trauma center. The management of patients with blunt force trauma necessitates the collaboration of an interpersonal healthcare team, which may include but is not limited to; a trauma surgeon, emergency department physician, anesthesiologist, and emergency and trauma nursing staff.

=== Treatment of abdominal trauma ===
In cases of blunt abdominal injury, the most frequent damage occurs in the small intestines, and in severe situations, this can result in small intestine perforation. Perforation of the small or large intestines is a serious concern due to its tremendous infectious potential. In these cases, it is essential to perform exploratory surgery to assess the internal damage, drain infected fluid in the abdomen, and clean the wound with saline. Prophylactic antibiotics are often necessary. In the case of multiple holes or significant damage to the blood supply of the intestines, the affected segment of tissue may need to be removed entirely.

=== Treatment of blunt cranial trauma ===
The treatment of blunt cranial trauma is dependent on the extent of the injury. A discussion between the patient and healthcare professionals will take place in order to carefully assess the patient's condition and determine the best approach for treatment. When considering the management of cranial trauma, it is crucial to ensure that the patient can breathe effectively. Effective breathing can be monitored using the patient's blood oxygen content via a pulse oximeter. The goal is to maintain greater than 90% oxygen saturation in the blood. If the patient cannot maintain appropriate blood oxygen levels on their own, mechanical ventilation may be indicated. Mechanical ventilation will add oxygen and remove carbon dioxide in the blood. It is also critically important to avoid low blood pressure in the setting of traumatic brain injuries. Studies have demonstrated improved outcomes in patients with systolic blood pressure greater than or equal to 120mmHg. Lastly, healthcare professionals should conduct consecutive neurological examinations to allow for early identification of elevated intracranial pressure and subsequent implementation of interventions to improve blood flow and reduce stress to the body. Of note, patients taking anticoagulant or antiplatelet therapy during the time of blunt cranial trauma should undergo rapid reversal of anticoagulating agents.

=== Treatment of blunt thoracic trauma ===
Nine out of ten patients with thoracic trauma can be treated effectively without a surgical operation. If surgery is indicated, there are numerous options available. A comprehensive discussion between the patient and the surgeon will take place to carefully evaluate the best approach, tailored to the patient's specific condition and injury. Conservative measures such as maintaining a clear and open airway, oxygen support, tube thoracostomy, and volume resuscitation are often given to manage blunt thoracic trauma. Oftentimes, pain control is the most basic and effective treatment approach because the presence of severe pain may lead to impairment of proper breathing, further exacerbating impaired lungs. Pain management in thoracic trauma patients improves the ability to breathe properly on their own, encourages the excretion of pulmonary secretions, and decreases the aggravation of inflammation and low oxygen levels in the blood. Nonsteroidal anti-inflammatory drugs, opioids, or regional pain management methods, such as local anesthetic, can be used for pain control.

== Epidemiology ==
Worldwide, a significant cause of disability and death in people under the age of 35 is trauma, of which most are due to blunt trauma.

== See also ==
- Thumping, a method of killing farm animals via blunt trauma
