= Kobe Bryant sexual assault allegations =

2003–2005 legal matter

Kobe Bryant in 2003 with the Los Angeles Lakers

In July 2003, allegations of sexual assault were made against American professional basketball player Kobe Bryant by a 19-year-old woman, resulting in criminal charges for felony sexual assault. In August 2004, a civil suit was filed against Bryant for the same incident, and in September the criminal case was dropped and charges were dismissed when the complainant decided not to testify. The civil case was later settled out of court.

On July 18, 2003, news media reported that the sheriff's office in Eagle, Colorado, had arrested Bryant in connection with an investigation of a sexual assault complaint filed by a 19-year-old hotel employee. The woman accused Bryant of raping her in his hotel room on the night of June 30. Bryant had checked into The Lodge and Spa at Cordillera, a hotel in Edwards, Colorado, that night in advance of having surgery near there.

The woman filed a police report July 1, and authorities questioned Bryant July 2, including about bruising on the woman's neck. Bryant eventually admitted to a sexual encounter with his accuser but insisted the sex was consensual.

Leading up to trial, the woman's identity was leaked and erroneously reported multiple times. Shortly after jury selection had begun in September 2004, she told prosecutors she could not take part in the trial, and they dropped the case and the criminal charges were dismissed. At this point, Bryant made a public statement, apologizing to his accuser, the public, and family, while denying the allegations. The civil suit was settled out of court in March 2005, with experts estimating that a monetary component may have exceeded $2.5 million, which was the maximum a plaintiff could win in damages in Colorado.

== Arrest ==
Eagle County Sheriff investigators confronted Bryant with the sexual assault accusation on July 2. During the July 2003 interview with investigators, Bryant initially told investigators that he did not have sexual intercourse with his accuser, a 19-year-old woman who worked at the hotel where Bryant was staying. When the officers told Bryant that she had taken an exam that yielded physical evidence, such as semen, Bryant admitted to having sexual intercourse with her, but stated that the sex was consensual. When asked about bruises on the accuser's neck, Bryant admitted to "strangling" her during the encounter, stating that he held her "from the back" "around her neck", that strangling during sex was his "thing" and that he had a pattern of strangling a different sex partner (not his wife) during their recurring sexual encounters. When asked how hard he was holding onto her neck, Bryant stated, "My hands are strong. I don't know." Bryant stated that he assumed consent for sex because of the accuser's body language.

Law enforcement officials collected evidence from Bryant and he agreed to submit to a rape test kit and a voluntary polygraph test. On July 4, Sheriff Joe Hoy issued an arrest warrant for Bryant. Bryant flew from Los Angeles back to Eagle, Colorado, to surrender to police. He was immediately released on $25,000 bond, and news of the arrest became public two days after that. On July 18, the Eagle County District Attorney's office filed a formal charge against Bryant for sexual assault. If convicted, Bryant faced probation to life in prison. On July 18, after he was formally charged, Bryant held a news conference in which he adamantly denied having raped the woman. He admitted to having an adulterous sexual encounter with her but insisted it was consensual.

== Criminal case ==
In December 2003, pre-trial hearings were conducted to consider motions about the admissibility of evidence. During those hearings, the prosecution accused Bryant's defense team of attacking his accuser's credibility. It was revealed that she wore underpants containing another man's semen and pubic hair to her rape exam the day after the alleged incident. Detective Doug Winters stated that the yellow underwear she wore to her rape exam contained sperm from another man, along with Caucasian pubic hair. Bryant's defense stated that the exam results showed "compelling evidence of innocence" because the accuser must have had another sexual encounter immediately after the incident. She told investigators that she grabbed dirty underwear by mistake from her laundry basket when she left her home for the examination. On the day she was examined, she said she hadn't showered since the morning of the incident. The examination found evidence of vaginal trauma, which Bryant's defense team suggested was consistent with having sex with multiple partners in two days — a claim denied by prosecutors.

The evidence recovered by police included the T-shirt that Bryant wore the night of the incident, which had three small stains of the accuser's blood on it. The smudge was verified to be the accuser's blood by DNA testing and probably was not menstrual blood because the accuser said she had her period two weeks earlier. It was revealed that Bryant leaned the woman over a chair to have sex with her, which allegedly caused the bleeding. This was the sex act in question, as the accuser claims she told Bryant to stop, but he would not, and Bryant claims he stopped after asking if he could ejaculate on her face.

Bobby Pietrack, the accuser's high school friend and a bellman at the resort, said she appeared to be very upset, was "very shaken" and crying, and "told me that Kobe Bryant had forced sex with her". However, Trina McKay, the resort's night auditor, said she saw the accuser as she was leaving to go home, and "she did not look or sound as if there had been any problem".

A few weeks before the trial was scheduled to begin, the accuser wrote a letter to state investigator Gerry Sandberg clarifying some details of her first interview by Colorado police. She wrote, "I told Detective Winters that on that morning while leaving I had car troubles. That was not true. When I called in late to work that day that was the reason I gave my boss for being late. In all reality, I had simply overslept . . . I told Detective Winters that Mr. Bryant had made me stay in the room and wash my face. While I was held against my will in that room, I was not forced to wash my face. I did not wash my face. Instead, I stopped at the mirror by the elevator on that floor to clean my face up. I am extremely disappointed in myself and also very sorry to anyone misled by that mix-up of information. I said what I said because I felt that Detective Winters did not believe what had happened to me."

Bryant's defense lawyer Pamela Mackey asserted that the accuser was taking an anti-psychotic drug for the treatment of schizophrenia at the time of the incident. Lindsey McKinney, who lived with the accuser, said the woman twice tried to kill herself at school by overdosing on sleeping pills. Before the alleged incident, the accuser, an aspiring singer, tried out for the television show American Idol with the song "Forgive" by Rebecca Lynn Howard, but failed to advance. In addition to the woman's moral character and reputation being challenged by Bryant's defense lawyer, she received death threats and hate mail and her identity was leaked multiple times.

On September 1, 2004, Eagle County District Judge Terry Ruckriegle dismissed the charges against Bryant, after prosecutors spent more than $200,000 preparing for trial, because his accuser informed them that she was unwilling to testify.

On the same day that the criminal case was dismissed, Bryant issued the following statement through his attorney:

First, I want to apologize directly to the young woman involved in this incident. I want to apologize to her for my behavior that night and for the consequences she has suffered in the past year. Although this year has been incredibly difficult for me personally, I can only imagine the pain she has had to endure. I also want to apologize to her parents and family members, and to my family and friends and supporters, and to the citizens of Eagle, Colorado.

I also want to make it clear that I do not question the motives of this young woman. No money has been paid to this woman. She has agreed that this statement will not be used against me in the civil case. Although I truly believe this encounter between us was consensual, I recognize now that she did not and does not view this incident the same way I did. After months of reviewing discovery, listening to her attorney, and even her testimony in person, I now understand how she feels that she did not consent to this encounter.

I issue this statement today fully aware that while one part of this case ends today, another remains. I understand that the civil case against me will go forward. That part of this case will be decided by and between the parties directly involved in the incident and will no longer be a financial or emotional drain on the citizens of the state of Colorado.

== Civil case ==
In August 2004, the accuser filed a civil lawsuit against Bryant over the incident. In March 2005, the two parties settled that lawsuit. The terms of the settlement were not disclosed to the public. The Los Angeles Times reported that legal experts estimated the settlement was more than $2.5 million.

== Aftermath ==
After the allegations, Bryant gifted his wife a $4 million eight-carat purple diamond ring, leading to speculation that it was an apology gift for his infidelities. Bryant signed a seven-year contract with the Los Angeles Lakers valued at $136 million, and he regained several of his endorsements from Nike, Spalding, and Coca-Cola, although his contracts with some other brands, including Nutella and McDonald's, were not renewed. Bryant issued a statement after the case was dismissed in 2004 and never discussed the matter publicly again.

In 2018, following the prominence of the MeToo movement, Bryant was removed from a panel for the Animation Is Film Festival after a petition raised concerns about Bryant's alleged past violent behavior. Public discussion of the case was renewed following Bryant's death in the 2020 Calabasas helicopter crash.

Eight months after the initial incident, the Lodge and Spa at Cordillera remodeled and some of the furniture was sold off. All furniture from the room Bryant had stayed in that night was disposed of and not offered for public sale. The building was sold in 2019 and converted into a drug treatment facility.
