= Preperitoneal packing =

- Other names: Preperitoneal pelvic packing

Preperitoneal packing, also known as preperitoneal pelvic packing, is a treatment option for those with a pelvic fracture who are experiencing bleeding and have a low blood pressure. It is recommended when angiographic embolization is not available in a timely manner.
