= Tile classification =

System of categorizing pelvic fractures

The Tile classification is a system of categorizing pelvic fractures based on fracture pattern, allowing judgment on the stability of the pelvic ring.

== Classification ==
| Tile Classification | 1 | 2 | 3 |
|---|---|---|---|
| A - stable | Innominate bone avulsion or wing fracture | Stable ring fracture with intact posterior arch | Denis III transverse sacral fracture |
| B - rotationally unstable/vertically stable | Open-book external rotation injury | Young-Burgess lateral compression type internal rotation injury | Bilateral |
| C - rotationally and vertically unstable | Unilateral with intact contralateral side | Unilateral with incomplete contralateral side | Bilateral |

== See also ==
- Young-Burgess classification
