= Bulbar urethral necrosis =

Bulbar urethral necrosis is a problem that can occur after a pelvic fracture associated urethral distraction defect (PFUDD).

== Description ==
A pelvic fracture can cause the urethra to separate, leading to a variable length of scar that can severely hamper the ability to urinate normally. The urethra is a tubular conduit that transports urine out of the bladder. The bulbar urethra is a segment of the male urethra that is in between the penile urethra and the membrano-prostatic urethra that typically has a robust blood supply. This blood supply includes antegrade flow from the paired bulbar arteries and circumflex arteries, and retrograde flow from the paired dorsal arteries of the penis.

== PFUDD treatment ==
The treatment for PFUDDs is scar excision and primary anastomosis, which means reconnecting the two ends of the urethra that were severed during the pelvic injury. Most patients do well with this but occasionally, stricture of the repair recurs and the patients may require redo surgery.

Surgery involves making an incision between the anus and scrotum (perineal incision) and dissecting out the bulbar urethra and locating the scar and membranoprostatic urethra. Dissecting the bulbar urethra destroys the antegrade blood flow. However, this urethra still does well since in still gets retrograde blood flow from the dorsal arteries. When patients have erectile dysfunction, the dorsal arteries do not work well and therefore the bulbar urethra does not get a good blood supply.

== Bulbar urethral necrosis susceptibility ==
Patients with erectile dysfunction (ED) and PFUDD or patients with PFUDD and traumatic disruption of the dorsal arteries are susceptible to bulbar urethral necrosis. These patients need tubularized substitution urethroplasty, which is replacement of the bulbar urethra with a various number of tubularized flaps ranging from scrotal skin to sigmoid colon (and others).

== Preoperative planning ==
Penile color duplex doppler ultrasound can help with preoperative planning to minimize bulbar necrosis.
