= Young–Burgess classification =

The Young–Burgess classification is a system of categorizing pelvic fractures based on the vector of applied force at the time of injury and degree of resulting disruption, allowing judgment on the stability of the pelvic ring and prediction of associated blood loss.

== Classification ==
Anteroposterior Compression (APC)	Lateral Compression (LC)	Vertical Shear (VS)	Combined Mechanical Injury (CM)
Force directed front to back against the pelvic ring	Direct (or indirect via the proximal femur) lateral impact against the pelvic ring	Superior directed force to one side of the pelvis	Combination of other injury vectors (e.g. LC + VS)
APC I - Symphysis widening < 2 cm	LC I - Compression fractures of the pubic rami (superior pubic ramus and inferior pubic ramus) and ipsilateral anterior sacral ala	VS - Symphysis diastasis or vertical pubic rami fractures with associated posterior injury (sacrum or SI joints)	CM - Combination of features of involved patterns
APC II - Symphysis widening > 2 cm. Anterior SI joint diastasis. Disruption of sacrospinous and sacrotuberous ligaments. An "open book" injury.	LC II - Rami fractures and ipsilateral posterior iliac wing fracture (crescent fracture) which may involve the SI joint	VS - Symphysis diastasis or vertical pubic rami fractures with associated posterior injury (sacrum or SI joints)	CM - Combination of features of involved patterns
APC III - SI dislocation often associated with vascular injury	LC III - Ipsilateral lateral compression and contralateral APC (windswept pelvis)	VS - Symphysis diastasis or vertical pubic rami fractures with associated posterior injury (sacrum or SI joints)	CM - Combination of features of involved patterns

== See also ==
- Tile classification
