= Vaginal trauma =

Female pelvic injury

- Specialty: Gynecology
- Causes: Rape, Sexual assault

Vaginal trauma is injury to the vagina. It can happen during childbirth, sexual assault, and accidental occurrences.

In adults, the vagina is largely protected from trauma due to the protective function of the mons pubis and labia majora. This protection is lacking in girls who lack a protective fat layer to protect the vagina. Vaginal trauma can occur when something is inserted into the vagina, for example, a sharp object causing penetrating trauma. Vaginal trauma can occur as a result of a painful sexual experience or sexual abuse. Vaginal trauma can occur in children as a result of a straddle injury. Most of these, though distressing, are not serious injuries.

In some instances, a severe injury occurs and requires immediate medical attention, especially if the bleeding will not stop. Vaginal trauma also occurs during an episiotomy and vaginal childbirth. Avoiding vaginal injuries during childbirth will help to prevent depression, hospital readmissions, and perineal pain.

== Signs and symptoms ==
Signs and symptoms include: abdominal pain, bleeding, bruising, faintness, vaginal discharge, embedded object in the vagina, genital pain, swelling, vomiting, painful urination, inability to urinate, presence of a wound, report of sexual abuse, and blood in the urine. A hematoma can form after vaginal trauma. Imaging can identify the presence of the accumulated blood.

== Cause ==
=== Pregnancy-related ===
During childbirth, vaginal or cervical injuries can occur and will likely require surgery to correct them. The vagina is sometimes injured during the course of labor and perineal tears extend from the vagina to various points of the perineum.

=== Non-pregnancy-related ===
Non-obstetric causes include: sexual assault, consensual sex, fracture of the pelvis, foreign object inserted into the vagina, jet ski and water-skiing accidents or blunt force trauma, such as being kicked or kneed in the groin during an athletic competition.

=== Risk factors ===
Risk factors include: first episode of consensual intercourse, breastfeeding, menopause, and medication side effects.

== Prevention ==
A safe environment can be created for young children in addition to keeping small objects out of reach.

== Treatment ==
Treatment begins with a thorough assessment. The presence of someone to provide support during the examination is very beneficial. Such support is especially prioritized in cases of vaginal trauma due to sexual assault. A support person provides emotional support and can help minimize the risk of re-traumatization. Those treating victims employ sexual assault nurse/forensic examiners (SAN/FEs) with specific training to care for those who have experienced rape or sexual assault. They are able to conduct a focused medical-legal exam. If such a trained clinician is not available, the emergency department has a sexual assault protocol that has been established for treatment and the collection of evidence.

== See also ==
- Major trauma
- Genital trauma
- Pediatric gynecology
- Emergency medicine
- Pelvic exam
