= Infant and toddler safety =

Infant and toddler safety are those actions and modifications put into place to keep babies and toddlers safe from accidental injury and death. Many accidents, injuries and deaths are preventable.

Infants begin to crawl around six to nine months of age. When they crawl, they are exposed to many dangers. According to data from the National Safety Council Injury Facts, children ages 0 to 4 years old have the highest rate of injury.

== Furniture ==
Toddlers typically enjoy climbing up things with steps. This includes furniture. Heavy furniture in the home is often not secured to the wall. These pieces of furniture can include bookcases and dressers that can weigh hundreds of pounds. Child nursery equipment injuries most often occur due to falls, entrapment, suffocation, strangulation, burns, and cuts or bruises. Heavy objects like televisions that are on the furniture can also fall onto the child. If the toddler climbs up the furniture, it is likely to fall onto the child. This has resulted in the deaths and injuries of children. Even if the children appear uninjured, it is possible that internal injuries have occurred with serious consequences. Often these injuries are not apparent to caregivers and as a consequence treatment can be delayed. Serious head injuries have also occurred.

== Toy defects ==
Design and manufacturing defects in toys can pose significant safety risks, contributing to a substantial number of emergency room visits for toy-related injuries among children. In 2022, children's products accounted for 100 recalls—the highest number recorded since 2013—and represented approximately 34% of all consumer product recalls that year.

== Lead poisoning ==
Unsafe levels of lead in the body of a child can cause problems for the rest of their life. Children living in low-income families are more likely to have levels of lead in their bodies. Questions regarding the testing procedures have been called into question. Children are at greater risk as they are more likely to put objects in their mouth such as those that contain lead paint and absorb a greater proportion of the lead that they eat. Treatment is available but prevention is better.

== Infant and toddler food safety ==
Infant food safety is the identification of risky food handling practices and the prevention of illness in infants. The most simple and easiest to implement is handwashing. Food for young children, including formula and baby food can contain pathogens that can make the child very ill and even die.

== Sudden infant death syndrome (SIDS) ==
Sudden infant death syndrome can cause the death of an infant, and often no cause is found. There are some preventative measures that can be taken to reduce the risk of SIDS. These are:

- Lay the infant on their back for sleeping.
- Breastfeeding
- Tilt the crib rails and prevent them from tilting.
- Keeping the mattress free of all objects and instead dress the infant warmly.
- Immunizations.
- Use a pacifier.
- Using a 'sleep sack' which prevents the infant from turning over and sleeping on her stomach.

== Child abuse ==
An infant or toddler is potentially vulnerable to physical abuse, sexual abuse, psychological abuse and neglect and has inability to verbalize the details of the abuse. Child grooming can be a concern and occurs when a perpetrator wins the trust of caregivers for the purpose of creating an opportunity for them to sexually abuse an infant or toddler. Shaken baby syndrome can often result in serious and permanent brain damage to an infant or toddler. There are preventative measures that can be taken to reduce the risk of injuring a child this way. Those who care for infants and toddlers may benefit from stress reduction. Becoming educated on normal child development can help someone understand that crying is a normal thing for babies and toddlers, especially if they hungry or need a diaper change. Caregivers can contact another person who is willing to give them a break. Those who are drinking alcohol are more likely to injure the infant or toddler. Carefully choosing someone else to watch the infant or toddler can also reduce the risk of injury.

== Car accidents ==
Children under the age of 3 were 43% are less likely to be injured in a car crash if their car seat was placed in the center of the car. The center position is the safest but the least used position.

== Hyperthermia and hypothermia ==
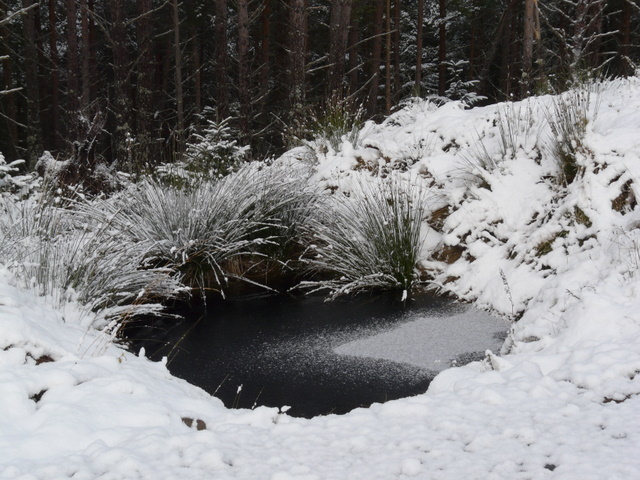
Even a very small icy pond can be hazardous for a toddler

Forgetting that an infant or toddler is in the car and leaving them where they are exposed to high temperatures can result in death.

Toddlers can wander off and fall through ice or be left out in cool or cold weather and experience hypothermia. This low body temperature is often fatal but instances of survival after a near drowning occur. Of all drowning deaths in 2013, 82,000 occurred in children less than five years old.

== Drowning ==
Toddlers have wandered off and drowned in ponds. Toddlers can easily drown in small, shallow ornamental ponds.

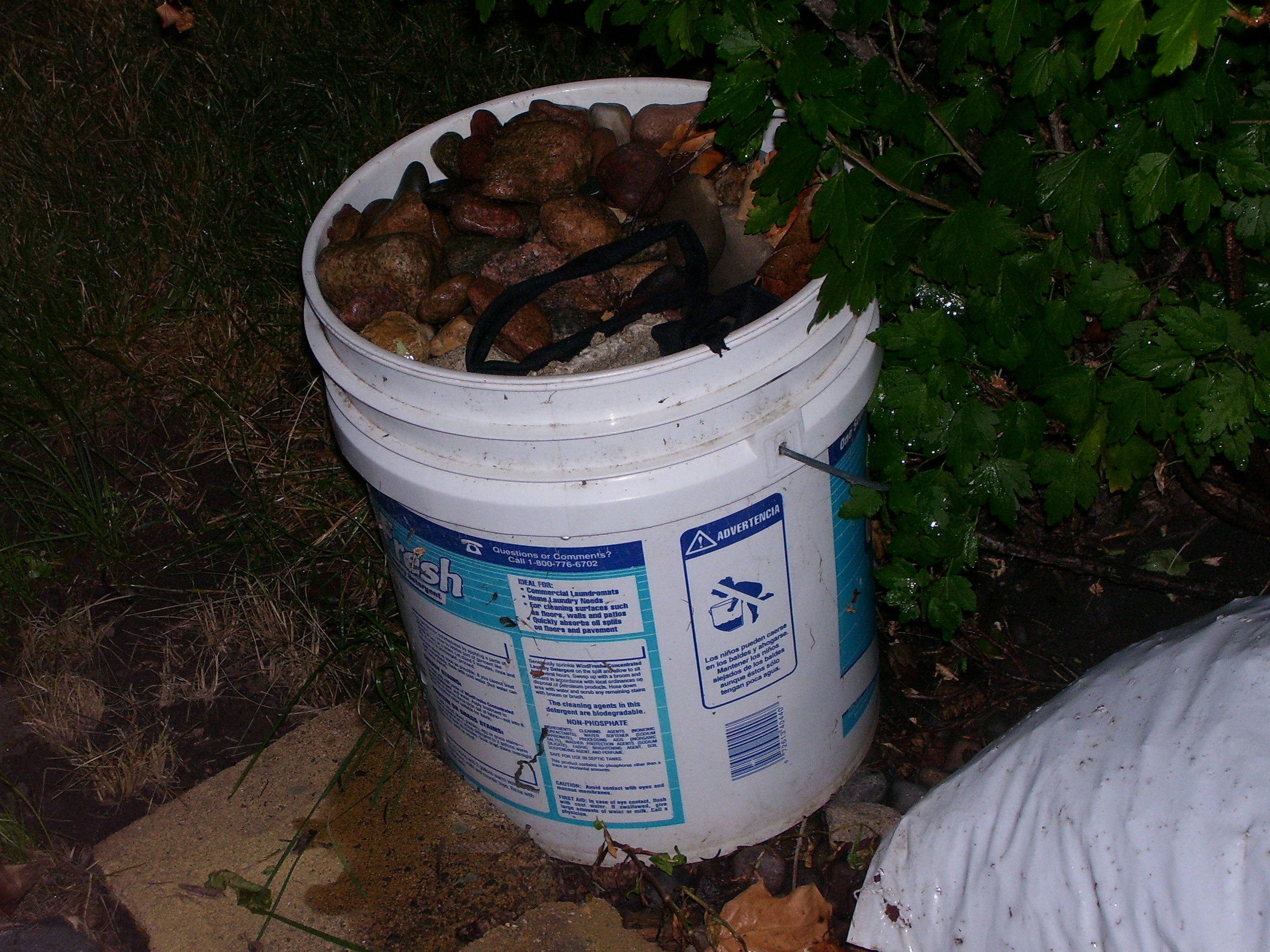
This five gallon bucket comes with a warning that it can be filled with fluid and an infant can drown.

== Animal attacks ==
An infant or toddler is more likely than other family members to be injured by an animal because they cannot defend themselves and are lower to the ground. Familiar family pets with no prior history of aggression are more likely to attack the child than unfamiliar pets from other households.

== Choking ==
Toddlers and infants who can hold objects can choke when a small object is inhaled and blocks the trachea.

== Falls ==
High chairs can be hazardous due to the risk of falls.
