= Pelvic binder =

Device used to compress the pelvis

- Example of using a sheet and cable ties to bind a pelvis.
- Other names: Pelvic sling
- Specialty: Emergency medicine

A pelvic binder is a device used to compress the pelvis in people with a pelvic fracture in an effort to stop bleeding.

== Uses ==
A pelvic binder is used to reduce haemorrhage after a pelvic fracture. It is used in the majority of patients where a ring fracture to the pelvis is suspected by paramedics or physicians. A pelvic binder is recommended for open book pelvic fractures. It might not be useful in people with lateral compression pelvic fractures.

A pelvic binder can be applied by paramedic before a patient reaches hospital, or by physicians and nurses when a patient is seen in an emergency department. It should only be used short term.

== Complications ==
Complications of a pelvic binder can include skin ulceration if it is applied for too long. Pelvic binders may be applied incorrectly in around 50% of patients.

== Technique ==
A pelvic binder should be placed over the upper femurs, specifically the greater trochanters. This is the best position to reduce diastasis symphysis pubis. A CT scan can be used to observe the effective placement of a pelvic binder. A bed sheet may be used as part of a pelvic binder.

A pelvic binder compresses pelvic structures. This encourages any blood in the pelvic cavity to clot, reducing any further bleeding. It also stabilises the pelvis.
