= AFF =

AFF, Aff or aff may refer to:

== Organizations ==
=== In sport ===
- Afghanistan Football Federation, the governing body of football in Afghanistan
- ASEAN Football Federation, a subset of nations within the Asian Football Confederation
- Australian Fencing Federation, the governing body of fencing in Australia

=== Other organizations ===
- Afghanistan Freedom Front, an anti-Taliban militant group
- Animal Farm Foundation, an advocacy group for pit bulls
- Arab Film Festival, a California nonprofit
- Armed Forces Foundation, a military non-profit support group
- Aspies For Freedom, a group advocating autism rights
- Austin Film Festival, a film festival in Austin, Texas

== Science, technology, and mathematics ==
- Species affinis, in biological open nomenclature (abbreviated "aff.")
- Advanced Forensic Format, a file format to store disk images and metadata
- Affine group, $\operatorname{Aff}$, the group of affine transformations on a space
- Automated Flight Following (AFF), a US Department of Agriculture system to track firefighting aircraft

== Other uses ==
- Aff (river), in western France
- Accelerated freefall, a method of skydiving training
- Adult FriendFinder, a commercial dating website
- Advanced Fighting Fantasy, a British roleplaying game
- Advance-fee fraud, a confidence trick
- A Fine Frenzy, a singer
- Affluence stop, MTR station code "AFF"
- United States Air Force Academy Airfield in Colorado Springs, Colorado, US (IATA airport code AFF)
