= National Canine Research Council =

Pit bull advocacy and policy study group

- Abbreviation: NCRC
- Founded: 2007
- Founder: Karen Delise
- Type: LLC
- Purpose: Producing studies and funding for pit bull advocacy, opposing breed-specific legislation, and casting doubt on opposing studies
- Origins: Acquired by Jane Berkey from Karen Delise in 2007
- Method: Publications, speakers, and conferences; also, funding for allied causes, groups, and websites through a separate action fund
- Owner: Jane Berkey, Animal Farm Foundation
- Key people: Karen Delise, Research Consultant
- Parent organization: Animal Farm Foundation
- Employees: ≈13
- Website: nationalcanineresearchcouncil.com

The National Canine Research Council (NCRC) is an animal advocacy group, originally started by Karen Delise, a veterinary technician. It was later acquired by Jane Berkey, the owner of Animal Farm Foundation and registered as National Canine Research Council, LLC in 2007. Its current website describes itself as "A Research & Policy Think Tank". The National Canine Research Council is a subsidiary of Animal Farm Foundation (AFF). The AVMA has published National Canine Research Council articles and also receives funding from Animal Farm Foundation. The National Canine Research Council has an associated 501(c)(4) fund called the National Canine Research Council Action Fund, which can directly support lobbying and political activities.

The National Canine Research Council's publications are intended to bolster the pro-pit bull and anti-BSL (anti-breed-specific-legislation) policies of its parent company, Animal Farm Foundation. AFF says it is the other way around and its policies are informed by NCRC findings.

Any discussion of pit bulls is controversial: Marie-Claude Malboeuf describes the pit bull lobby and the pit bull victims groups as fighting like cats and dogs in her La Presse article on the pit bull debate:

The two camps—pro and anti-pit bulls—don't join battle merely in a war of studies. In 2010, pit bull promoters turned to hijacking website names resembling the [dogbite] victims site Dogsbite.org, buying similar domains (Dogsbite.com and Dogsbite.net). Brutal denunciations and innuendoes rain down in social media and blogs, each side displaying its contempt for the other camp. Jeff Borchardt, who saw his baby killed by pit bulls, saves Twitter screen shots about him saying [things like]: "He is like a fart in a storm. Nobody hears him or cares about him". Like other victims, he receives death threats. For her part, the founder of Dogsbite saves emails of a former leader of the lobby with a criminal past. He threatens [Dogsbite] with lawsuits, writing that he has sent her personal information to the FBI because she could be "a terrorist", and that her movement "fabricates attacks and deliberately sets pit bulls loose at large". On their side, pit bull owners report being brutally denounced and sometimes insulted when they are peacefully walking their dogs.

== As part of the pit lobby ==
Marie-Claude Malboeuf, reporter for Montreal's La Presse, described the pit bull lobby led by Animal Farm Foundation as comprising five different levels, (Note: Briefly, the five levels are: 1. Animal Farm Foundation, as the source of financing; 2. The National Canine Research Council, to produce studies for Animal Farm Foundation's use; 3. The Journal of the American Veterinary Medical Association, to publish NCRC's studies; 4. Best Friends Animal Society, to act as a political lobby; 5. The animal care industry (shelters, breeders, trainers, etc.) to widely publicize the studies and attack opponents) with the National Canine Research Council playing a pivotal role in producing studies that lobbyists can use as ammunition in arguing for laws repealing breed-specific legislation and pit bull supporters can use to argue that pit bull type dogs are not inherently dangerous or vicious.

== Ownership ==
NCRC is owned by the Animal Farm Foundation, an organization whose purpose is "securing equal treatment and opportunity for 'pit bull' dogs."

The relationship between Animal Farm Foundation and National Canine Research Council was not known from the time of its acquisition in 2007 until 2010 when DogsBite.org filed a WIPO arbitration in a domain name dispute. The process uncovered the connection between AFF and NCRC, when AFF was found to be the domain name owner of DogsBite.com and DogsBite.net which both redirected users to NCRC's website, nationalcanineresearchcouncil.com. This led to the discovery that NCRC was funded by AFF. As of 2024, the AFF website discloses the relationship, but the NCRC website does not.

== Role in Montreal pit bull ban ==
When Montreal was debating a pit bull ban in 2016, the Order of Veterinary Physicians of Quebec (French: L'Ordre des médecins vétérinaires du Québec) developed a report opposing a pit bull ban by, in part, relying on NCRC publications funded by Animal Farm Foundation.

Marie-Claude Malboeuf writes in her La Presse five-part article, in the section "De quel Côté Penche la Science?" ("Which Side is Science Leaning Towards?") that the president of L'Ordre des médecins vétérinaires du Québec, Dr. Joël Bergeron, dismissed arguments made in medical studies. She wrote:

This last conclusion is drawn from a study by the National Canine Research Council (NCRC), which belongs to a pressure group, Animal Farm Foundation, entirely dedicated to the defense of pit bulls ...

NCRC Director Karen Delise revisited all fatal canine attacks from 2000 to 2009. Based on her overview, the media all identify the same breed of dog (sometimes crossbreed) and identify the same breed as the authorities in 83% to 89% of cases. She still concludes that they are right 18% of the time.

The animal care technician has no proof that the media are wrong. But for her, no matter who informs them – including the masters – no dog can be called a pit bull, a German shepherd, etc. unless purebred and officially registered with a kennel club.

After Marie-Claude Malboeuf's La Presse article on pit bulls was released, Dr. Joël Bergeron wrote an opinion article for La Presse, expressing regret that five National Canine Research Council studies had been included without at least qualifying that they had been funded by Animal Farm Foundation.

== Contrasting positions ==
=== Recommendations on breed-specific legislation ===
The National Canine Research Council provides a downloadable brochure titled "Breed-Specific Legislation", which is intended to help activists opposing BSL. The brochure says:

The trend reflects a growing understanding that regulating dogs on the basis of breed or physical description does not reduce dog bites. An evidence-based analysis published in 2010 offers one explanation for the failure of BSL: absurdly large numbers of targeted breeds would have to be completely removed from a community in order to prevent even one serious dog-bite related injury. Most importantly, studies continue to show that one kind of dog is no more likely to threaten or bite a human being than another.

In contrast, advocacy groups for dog attack victims argue that BSL laws "are designed as a proactive measure to prevent severe disfiguring dog attacks and fatalities", and not just to reduce "dog bites". They point to numerous medical studies showing that pit bulls are disproportionately responsible for these kind of serious attacks, especially to children.

Furthermore, NCRC's brochure attacks opponents by saying (p. 4): "All breed-specific policies and laws can be traced to racism, classism, and ableism." Again, advocacy groups for pit bull victims differ; they believe BSL laws help keep all communities safer, especially for families and children, as "The objective of breed-specific legislation, which primarily targets pit bulls and their derivatives, is to prevent severe and fatal attacks before they occur".

=== Arguments over the reliability of media reports ===
Pit bull advocates claim that media reports are unreliable, especially when pit bulls are identified in attacks. Mark Kelley said that:

They point to analysis by the National Canine Research Council, which is run by a pro-pit bull foundation, that claims there is ...no reliable evidence that demonstrates a link between breed and fatal dog bites. They also claim pit bulls are routinely misidentified as the guilty party.

When Dr. Golinko, Director Of Plastic Surgery at the Arkansas Children's Hospital in Little Rock, Arkansas, was asked about a medical study he authored identifying pit bulls as causing the most severe injuries, far more than any other breed, he explained:

Mark: How were you able to identify whether these were in fact pit bulls that had attacked these victims?

Dr. Golinko: That's a great question. It's because the majority of the biting dogs is either a family dog or a dog known to the family, meaning, you know, mom's boyfriend or ex-husband brings over a dog, or grandma brings over a dog, it's typically a dog that the child is familiar with, in most situations.

== Comparisons between the pit lobby and tobacco lobby ==
Dr. Barry Pless, Professor Emeritus at McGill University and founder of the journal Injury Prevention, (Note: The Injury Prevention journal is published by BMJ Group, which publishes medical journals, including the British Medical Journal.) compared the pit bull lobby to the tobacco lobby; he said, "Conducting studies aimed primarily at preventing the adoption of laws and not declaring one's conflicts of interest is the strategy employed by the gun lobby and the tobacco lobby." Dr. Barry Pless is an authority (Note: For example, Dr. Barry Pless has over 13000 citations on Google Scholar.) in pediatric trauma, epidemiology and biostatistics hired by La Presse as an independent expert. Marie-Claude Malboeuf, a reporter at La Presse, similarly described the pit bull lobby as "a new tobacco lobby".

In general, the tobacco industry playbook to defeat unfavorable regulation has one overarching objective and that is to cast doubt on existing science. Various tactics are used: funding research to produce desired results—frequently using front groups; offering gifts and consulting arrangements; deflecting attention from public health problems by reframing the problem in terms of issues of personal responsibility; and using courts to challenge critics and unfavorable regulations.

In her memoir Acknowledgements, Barbara Kay, a conservative columnist for the Canadian newspaper National Post, also compared the tactics of the pit bull advocacy movement (PBAM) to tobacco industry tactics:

A disinformation campaign about pit bulls has been in progress for thirty years. Humane societies, having succumbed like other official bodies to PBAM pressure, push pit bulls as good companion animals in the same shameful way that cigarette companies once pushed tobacco as a benign, relaxing and even therapeutic product."

Additionally, she provided telling examples of how opponents are aggressively attacked and intimidated, a key aspect of tobacco industry tactics:

As a journalist who attempts to inform the public of the truth about pit bulls, I can certainly attest to the vigour and singlemindedness of PBAM's rank and file in their determination to chill any discourse in the public forum that exposes pit bull myths. I have been called a racist, a bigot and an advocate for doing to pit bulls "what Hitler did to the Jews." PBAM activists have written to my editor accusing me of a lack of journalistic integrity. PBAM activists follow me on Twitter to monitor my tweets and swiftly react to any that "diss" pit bulls.

Other journalists confirm to me that they receive the same treatment when they step with "incorrect" attitudes into this peculiar social quagmire. But the persecution of journalists is merely the tip of an intimidation iceberg. Well under the public radar, PBAM has had great success in cowing an entire dog-related infrastructure.

Victim advocates' groups, such as http://dogsbite.org, http://nationalpitbullvictimawareness.org, and http://daxtonsfriends.com see even more detailed parallels between the pit bull and tobacco lobbies, e.g., pointing out:

- Cherry-picking of data in literature surveys, as in the AVMA literature survey paper frequently cited by pit bull supporters
- Misrepresenting the purpose of breed-specific legislation as bites, rather than preventing catastrophic dog attacks
- Treating all dog bites the same, whether the bite is a light scratch, or more than a hundred bites with face and flesh torn off and limbs eviscerated
- Arguing over terminology and identification, e.g., arguing over what a "pit bull" is and whether a pit bull can be identified without DNA evidence
- Dismissing independent media statistics that do not meet impossibly high standards of certainty (DNA testing) Similarly, these victim advocates' groups see the problem of dangerous dogs, descended from fighting breeds, being reframed as a problem of irresponsible owners, insufficient training, and situational factors that provoked or startled the dog, such as a child crying—basically, anything other than whether the dog is a pit bull type dog or not—as simply misdirection from the primary cause—the dog's genetic inheritance from bloodsport dogs that were intended to fight to the death.

A detailed comparison of the Tobacco Lobby and the Pit Bull Lobby from the point of view of the victim's advocate group http://dogsbite.org draws these parallels:

Parallels between tactics of the Tobacco Lobby and those of the Pit Bull Lobby
Tactic	Tobacco Lobby	Pit Lobby
Trumpeting Experts	Paid medical experts	Paid veterinary experts
Misdirection to other factors	Other risk factors for heart disease / cancer	Other "contributing factors" in fatal dog attacks
Arguing terminology	"cancer" isn't a scientific term; there are many kinds	"pit bull" is meaningless slang; there is more than one breed
The primary risk isn't determinate as the result isn't inevitable	Since not all people who smoke get lung cancer, smoking can't be the cause	Since not all pit bulls attack, genetics and breed can't be the cause
Arguing the statistics are inadequate without the highest standard of evidence	"Death certificates are notoriously inaccurate"—According to the Tobacco Institute, only autopsies are accurate enough to determine lung cancer is the cause of death	Dogs are misidentified as pit bulls; only DNA tests can confirm that a dog is a pit bull

== See also ==
- Animal Farm Foundation
- Dog-fighting
- Public relations
- Third-party technique
- Tobacco industry playbook
