= Animal Farm Foundation =

Pit bull advocacy group against BSL

Animal Farm Foundation, Inc.
- Founded: 1985
- Founder: Jane Berkey
- Type: 501(c)3 non-profit
- Purpose: Advocacy for pit bull type dogs and opposing breed specific legislation
- Location: United States
- Method: Public relations including branding, marketing, legal action, and lobbying
- Owner: Jane Berkey
- Key people: Jane Berkey, president
- Subsidiaries: National Canine Research Council
- Endowment: ≈$6M+
- Employees: ≈10
- Website: animalfarmfoundation.org

Animal Farm Foundation (AFF) is a pit bull and anti-BSL (anti-breed-specific legislation) animal advocacy group set up by heiress Jane Berkey as a 501(c)(3) charity. It started as a horse rescue in 1985, then shifted focus to pit bull dogs when the founder adopted a pit bull and "discovered that 'pit bull' dog owners were not welcome in a lot of communities and spaces."

AFF maintains a farm of 400 acres in Dutchess County for "rescued and retired horses, cows and other farm life." It notes that dogs are their "main mission". The 2021 Guidestar report for Animal Farm Foundation describes their mission as "Securing equal treatment and opportunity for 'pit bull' dogs."

Animal Farm Foundation is controversial and highly influential: It has been described by Canadian Broadcasting Corporation's journalist Mark Kelley, as having a key role in a "pit bull lobby" in the investigative news series The Fifth Estate:

There’s actually something that we’re learning ... [that there is] a pro-pit bull lobby. When I started investigating this, I thought this couldn’t be. You got animal rights groups in United States. The Animal Farm Foundation is one, Best Friends Animal Society is another. These are multi-million dollar animal rights groups. They’ve got lawyers. They’ve got lobbyists, got market celebrities on their side: The dog whisperer, Jennifer Aniston, to Betty White posing with her dog saying that this is a perfect family-friendly dog, but it’s more than a marketing effort. It’s also a political effort right now in the United States. This lobby has convinced 21 states to ban bans, so if you were in your community in one of those 21 states it’s illegal to bring in a pit bull ban breed specific legislation, so it’s a political force.

== The key role in the pit bull lobby ==
Marie-Claude Malboeuf, reporter for Montreal's La Presse, described the pit bull lobby as an extensive and well-funded network, comprising five different levels:

1. Financing—provided by Animal Farm Foundation.
2. Policy studies—produced by the National Canine Research Council (NCRC), a research organization acquired by Animal Farm Foundation. They also fund projects consistent with pit bull and anti-BSL advocacy.
3. Publication—of the NCRC studies by the Journal of the American Veterinary Medical Association, which also links to Animal Farm Foundation and promotes its views.
4. Political Lobbying—by members of Best Friends Animal Society and by their lobbyists to exert pressure on elected officials to advocate legislation favoring pit bull owners and opposing breed-specific legislation.
5. Social Media Broadcasting—by shelters, breeders, trainers, and pit bull-related websites that promote AFF positions while attacking opponents in social media, often citing NCRC studies as justification.

== Advocacy through public relations and legal firms ==
Animal Farm Foundation has worked with three public relations firms:

1. The Wakeman Agency
2. Coyne PR
3. Gatesman Agency

and one major law firm, Husch Blackwell.

The first PR firm, the Wakeman Agency, worked "to increase AFF’s media presence, to target specific cities with media campaigns to overturn legislation, and to strengthen their public voice through op-eds" so AFF would be perceived as an "expert and burgeoning thought leader on the issue of breed-specific legislation."

A second PR firm, Coyne PR, helped Animal Farm Foundation set up The Majority Project, a web site for pit bull owners to band together and share common experiences. Coyne PR described their work as helping "correct the misperception of 'pit bull' dogs", using a "PSA campaign ... to put brand spokespeople in the spotlight both nationally and locally." The National Canine Research Council, a subsidiary of AFF, also worked with Coyne PR, in this case to "train police officers on the proper way to approach and deal with dogs."

The third PR firm, Gatesman Agency, described their work with AFF as an "award-winning campaign [that] spanned eight months and involved local, trade and national media relations, a community event and a special newsjacking stunt that hijacked the social media conversation surrounding Pit Bull Awareness Month." Gatesman said they had used their "Hacking Human Behavior™ approach" and performed "a deep dive into audience research that revealed the emotional motivations behind misperceptions about pit bulls" and then created "messages, visuals and storylines to generate a very different emotional response. According to Animal Farm Foundation's 2017 990 PF records, AFF paid $262,938 to the Gatesman Agency.

Turning to the legal side, Animal Farm Foundation used the legal firm of Husch Blackwell LLP to challenge existing pit bull bans in Sioux City, Iowa; Council Bluffs, Iowa; and Williston, North Dakota. Over just two years, AFF paid Husch Blackwell $102,298 in 2020 and $961,764 in 2021.

Husch Blackwell also represented AFF in the WIPO arbitration in a domain name dispute, during which NCRC was discovered to be funded by AFF after AFF was found to be the domain name owner of DogsBite.com and DogsBite.net. (Note: Marie-Claude Malboeuf's La Presse article says,"To produce studies, the Animal Farm Foundation purchased a private research organization in 2007. The acquisition was kept secret until the Dogbite Victims Group discovered it, during a legal dispute.”) (Note: In AFF's response to the WIPO complaint dated June 21, 2010, page 4: "In July 2007, AFF purchased all right, title and interest in the National Canine Research Council, including its intellectual property and the domain name nationalcanineresearchcouncil.com from Karen Delise. At that time, AFF established the National Canine Research Council, LLC, a Delaware limited liability company ("NCRC"). AFF is the sole member of NCRC.) Both sites redirect users to the NCRC website, nationalcanineresearchcouncil.com.

== Overview of the controversy ==
Mark Kelley, reporter for CBC's The Fifth Estate, presented both sides of the pit bull controversy succinctly in a preview to the video investigative report "Pit Bulls Unleashed: Should They be Banned?":

Mark Kelley: Pit bull-type dogs are considered so vicious by many that they are banned or restricted in more than 30 countries. But these powerful dogs are getting a multi-million dollar makeover by some powerful friends in the pro-pit bull lobby.
...

Mark Kelley: Why do pit bulls need lobbying?
Ledy VanKavage: Well, I think they are the most misunderstood dog there is and … they’re just dogs, they’re not werewolves.
...
Mark Kelley: Their message: the pit bull is the underdog. User-friendly, family-friendly, and the lobby is trying to silence its critics in Canada and the US.

Jeff Borchardt: It’s like David and Goliath: Every time we think we are getting our message out there, someone else is killed.

In the quote above, Ledy VanKavage is a "lawyer, lobbyist, and a lifelong pit bull lover" for Best Friends Animal Society, which advocates for pit bull owners and against breed-specific legislation. In contrast, Jeff Borchardt's son Daxton was killed by pit bulls when his baby sitter's two pit bull dogs attacked 11-month-old Daxton. Subsequently, he started the website "Daxton's Friends", and advocates for pit bull victims and in favor of breed-specific legislation.

== Contrasting positions between the pit bull lobby and pit bull victim advocates ==
Animal Farm Foundation and its subsidiary National Canine Research Council argue that BSL (breed-specific legislation) does not reduce dog bites. Further, they say that no particular breed is more likely to bite than another and "absurdly large numbers of targeted breeds would have to be completely removed from a community in order to prevent even one serious dog-bite related injury."

In contrast, Mark Kelley, in a Q&A session on the Fifth Estate's video, "Pit Bulls Unleashed: Should They Be Banned?", found that most medical studies, especially in pediatric trauma, came to a different conclusion. He responded to viewer questions about Director of Plastic Surgery at the Children's Hospital in Little Rock, Arkansas, Dr. Golinko, and his findings that pit bulls caused the majority of the most severe injuries and deaths:

I think it’s an important point to make about these studies from Dr. Golinko. They only confirm previous studies that have been done. In 2009, a study out of Philadelphia; 2011, a study that came out of the University of Texas Health Science Center; 2015, a study that came out of the University of California, all about dog bites. Now what they conclude, in general, is that pit bull attacks have more severe injuries than dog bites from other breeds and a higher risk of death. There is worldwide consensus among the literature that individuals under 18 are the most susceptible to these bite injuries and the largest emergency department study to date found boys from five to nine years old the most susceptible to these bite injuries.

Consequently, pit bull victim advocates argue that BSL is intended to reduce serious dog attacks, attacks where victims are mauled, maimed, disfigured, or killed, and that viewing the aim as simply reducing bites misrepresents their position. Further, most independent studies conclude that pit bull type dogs are indeed responsible for the vast majority of severe injuries or fatalities.

== Accusations of deception and harassment ==
The techniques of Animal Farm Foundation, in particular the use of the National Canine Research Council to produce studies that contrast with independent studies showing that pit bull-type dogs are a serious and growing worldwide problem, has been likened to tobacco industry tactics, in particular the use of ostensibly independent front organizations to produce scientific studies rebutting existing studies.

The link between Animal Farm Foundation and the National Canine Research Council was unknown from when Jane Berkey acquired the National Canine Research Council in 2007 up until 2010, when Dogsbite.org unsuccessfully filed a WIPO arbitration in a domain name dispute. The domain names in question, Dogsbite.net and Dogsbite.com, still redirect browsers to the National Canine Research Council website.

During the debate over a pit bull ban in Montreal in 2016, Emeritus McGill University professor Dr. Barry Pless, an expert (Note: For example, Dr. Barry Pless has over 13000 citations on Google Scholar.) in Pediatric Trauma and Epidemiology, as well as founder of the medical journal Injury Prevention, (Note: The Injury Prevention journal is published by BMJ Group, which publishes medical journals, including the British Medical Journal.) acted as an independent consultant for the Canadian newspaper La Presse. Dr. Pless was "scandalized at the abuse of epidemiological norms he found being used to launder pit bulls". He said: “To conduct studies, which aim first of all to prevent laws from being adopted and not declare their conflict of interest, is the strategy employed by the weapons lobby and the tobacco lobby.” Rampton and Stauber, in their book Trust Us, We're Experts, explained the public relations use of the third party technique referred to here, and used by the tobacco industry, saying that “The tobacco industry…helped invent the strategy of using scientists as third-party advocates…”.

== Arguments over identifying pit bull type dogs ==
Animal Farm Foundation has funded studies by the National Canine Research Council that have concluded that pit bull-type dogs cannot be reliably identified based solely on visual identification.

In contrast, victim advocate sites point out multiple court cases that ruled that ordinary dog owners can identify pit bull-type dogs. Specifically, the courts determined "a dog owner of ordinary intelligence can determine if he does in fact own a dog commonly known as a pit bull." Furthermore, the courts have ruled "there is no constitutional requirement that legislation be written with scientific precision to be enforceable." So, DNA sampling need not be done for every media-reported case to be valid, and as Dr. Golinko noted in his interview, in most pediatric trauma cases the identification was straightforward:

Mark: How were you able to identify whether these were in fact pit bulls that had attacked these victims?

Dr. Golinko: That’s a great question. It’s because the majority of the biting dogs is either a family dog or a dog known to the family, meaning, you know, mom's boyfriend or ex-husband brings over a dog, or grandma brings over a dog, it's typically a dog that the child is familiar with, in most situations.

== Arguments over tracking dog attacks by breed ==
Karen Delise, former director and founder of the National Canine Research Council, has argued that "media accounts of dog attacks are often seriously flawed". The National Canine Research Council has produced studies to cast doubt on news reports where pit bulls are identified as killing people by variously discrediting the news media for inaccurate or "sensationalist" reporting; discrediting visual identification by saying only expert identification or forensics, such as DNA analysis, is reliable; and further attacking critics by attributing the motives of those in favor of BSL to racism and discrimination, e.g., saying that "All breed-specific policies and laws can be traced to racism, classism, and ableism."

In contrast, victim advocates, such as Dogsbite.org, track all dog fatalities reported in the US, including breed reports and photographs of the dogs. Dogsbite.org has been used as a source in a Forbes article on pit bull danger and recommended as a source for pit bull dog owners by D. Caroline Coile, PhD, who has authored 34 books, including Pit Bulls for Dummies and Barron's Encyclopedia of Dog Breeds.

== See also ==
- Dog-fighting
- National Canine Research Council
- Pit bull
- Public relations
- Third-party technique
- Tobacco industry playbook
