= Oxford American =

American literary magazine

- Spring 2005 cover
- Editor: Sara A. Lewis
- Categories: Literature, art, and culture
- Frequency: Quarterly
- Publisher: The Oxford American Literary Project, Inc., in alliance with the University of Central Arkansas
- Founder: Marc Smirnoff
- Founded: 1989
- First issue: March 14, 1992
- Company: Oxford American Literary Project
- Country: United States
- Based in: Conway, Arkansas
- Website: oxfordamerican.org (2009–) oxfordamericanmag.com (2000–2009)
- ISSN: 1074-4525

The Oxford American is a quarterly literary magazine about the American South, published by the nonprofit Oxford American Literary Project in partnership with the University of Central Arkansas in Conway, Arkansas. Founded by Marc Smirnoff in Oxford, Mississippi, it published its first issue in 1992 and suspended publication several times for lack of funding before settling at the university in 2004. It publishes short fiction, poetry, and articles, and an annual Southern Music Issue.

The magazine has won four National Magazine Awards, including two for its Southern Music Issue and one for General Excellence in 2016, and received a Whiting Literary Magazine Prize in 2023.

== History ==
=== Oxford, Mississippi (1989–1994) ===
The magazine was founded in late 1989 in Oxford, Mississippi, by Marc Smirnoff. The name "Oxford American" is a play on The American Mercury, H. L. Mencken's general interest magazine, which Smirnoff long admired. The debut issue was published on Saturday, March 14, 1992. Its cover featured a fire-engine red background with white text and a "photo-realistic" painting of an abandoned gasoline pump by Oxford painter Glennray Tutor. Three more issues were published, including one featuring previously unpublished photographs by Eudora Welty. The magazine then ceased publication in mid-1994 for lack of funding.

=== Grisham revival (1995–2001) ===
In April 1995, author and Oxford resident John Grisham secured financing to bring the magazine back into publication. The magazine had a new look and was printed on coated paper stock with a higher page count and new advertisers. In 2000, Grisham published a serialized version of A Painted House in the Oxford American. The magazine was not commercially viable, and in September 2001 it stopped publication for a second time.

=== Little Rock (2002–2003) ===
The magazine began its third incarnation in late 2002, headquartered in Little Rock, Arkansas, and relaunched as a bimonthly. It was published in conjunction with the AtHome, Inc., group of magazines. Due to insufficient advertising revenue, it again stopped publication in late 2003.

=== University of Central Arkansas (2004–2012) ===
After $500,000 in financing was secured, the University of Central Arkansas in Conway, Arkansas, assumed the role of publisher, and the magazine resumed publication in December 2004 as a quarterly. The magazine became a nonprofit publication. Its editorial offices are on the first floor of McCastlain Hall on the university grounds.

In 2008, a business secretary was discovered to have been embezzling money from the magazine since 2007. The secretary, who reported to the magazine's publisher Ray Wittenberg, pleaded guilty to theft and forgery, was briefly imprisoned, and was ordered to pay $102,000 in restitution to the magazine. In the aftermath of the embezzlement, the university demoted Wittenberg, loaned the magazine additional funds, and assumed control of its business operations, installing the university's spokesman, Warwick Sabin, as publisher. In February 2009, a "mystery donor" gave the magazine $100,000 after the embezzlement left it owing back taxes to the IRS.

=== 2012 leadership change ===
In July 2012, a few weeks before Issue 78 was published, several editorial employees, including a recently fired senior editor and a recently fired intern, made allegations of sexual harassment against founder and editor Marc Smirnoff and managing editor Carol Ann Fitzgerald. Within a week, the two were fired and publisher Warwick Sabin became interim editor. Smirnoff and Fitzgerald denied the allegations, described them as retaliation by disgruntled employees, and said they had not been given a chance to defend themselves. Columnist John Brummett questioned the board's grounds for the dismissals.

In September 2012, Roger D. Hodge, a former editor of Harper's Magazine, replaced Sabin as editor. Samir Husni, a journalism professor at the University of Mississippi and a former consultant to the magazine, speculated on the uncertain future of the "iconic" magazine without its founder. In December 2012, The New York Times called Smirnoff "the most important editor out of the South since Willie Morris."

=== 2012–present ===
In October 2012, the Oxford American and the University of Central Arkansas renewed their alliance for five years on the understanding that the magazine would repay its debt to the university, then $700,000. The magazine's chairman of the board, Richard N. Massey, pledged to repay the debt at a rate of about $69,000 a year over about five years.

Hodge stepped down in May 2015, and in October 2015 Eliza Borné was named editor. In January 2016, Ryan Harris was named executive director of the Oxford American Literary Project, the nonprofit organization that publishes the magazine. In January 2021, the editorial offices returned to the UCA campus from downtown Little Rock.

In March 2021, Borné stepped down to join the Central Arkansas Library System, and executive editor Sara A. Lewis was promoted to executive director, the first woman in that role. Danielle Amir Jackson, managing editor since February 2020, was named interim editor and became editor in May 2021, the first Black editor-in-chief in the magazine's history. Jackson stepped down in June 2024, and Lewis became interim editor. She was subsequently named editor-in-chief.

== Content ==
The magazine has published previously unpublished work by William Faulkner, Margaret Walker, James Agee, and James Dickey. It has also published occasional special issues on Southern art, architecture, film, and food. In 2017, it published a 25th anniversary issue. Reviewing it, The Washington Post book critic Ron Charles called the Oxford American a "regional magazine that defies the regional label." Across three issues that year, the magazine published excerpts of Jesmyn Ward's novel Sing, Unburied, Sing, which went on to win the 2017 National Book Award for Fiction. In March 2018, the Oxford American published its 100th issue, featuring an original cover painting by Wayne White.

=== Southern Music Issue ===
The annual Southern Music Issue covers lesser-known Southern musicians and has included a compilation CD. It won the National Magazine Award for Single-Topic Issue in 1999 and 2003.

=== Contributors ===
Writers published in the magazine have included John Grisham, Barry Hannah, Steve Martin, Roy Blount Jr., Billy Collins, Charles Bukowski, and Susan Sontag. Food writer John T. Edge was a recurring columnist.

As of October 2026, the magazine's contributing editors are:

- Lucy Alibar
- Rebecca Bengal
- Rosalind Bentley
- Roy Blount Jr.
- Wendy Brenner
- Kevin Brockmeier
- Bronwen Dickey
- Lolis Eric Elie
- Beth Ann Fennelly
- Leslie Jamison
- Harrison Scott Key
- Kiese Laymon
- Jessica Lynne
- Alex Mar
- Greil Marcus
- Tayler Montague
- Duncan Murrell
- Chris Offutt
- Imani Perry
- Amanda Petrusich
- Padgett Powell
- Jamie Quatro
- Tauheed Rahim II
- David Ramsey
- Diane Roberts
- Zandria F. Robinson
- John Jeremiah Sullivan
- Carina del Valle Schorske

== Programs ==
In late 2011, the magazine leased a building at 1300 Main Street in downtown Little Rock to house its business offices. From 2013 the building also contained South on Main, a restaurant and performance venue that hosted literary and music events; it closed in the early 2020s.

In 2017, the Oxford American Literary Project established the Oxford American Jeff Baskin Writers Fellowship "to support the writing of a debut book of creative nonfiction." The fellowship includes a $10,000 living stipend, housing, and an editorial apprenticeship with the magazine. Molly McCully Brown was its inaugural recipient.

== Awards and recognition ==
The Oxford American has won four National Magazine Awards and, as of 2017, had received fourteen nominations. Its Southern Music Issue won for Single-Topic Issue in 1999 and 2003. In 2016, the magazine won General Excellence in the Literature, Science, and Politics category, its first General Excellence nomination since 1999. It was nominated for General Excellence in 2018 and once more during Jackson's tenure. In 2023, it received a Whiting Literary Magazine Prize.

== Anthologies ==
- Best of the Oxford American: Ten Years from the Southern Magazine of Good Writing. Hill Street Press. 2002.
- The Oxford American Book of Great Music Writing. University of Arkansas Press. 2010. ISBN 978-1-55728-950-6. Archived from the original on January 27, 2011.

== Editors ==
Editor	Tenure
Marc Smirnoff	1992–2012
Warwick Sabin	2012 (interim)
Roger D. Hodge	2012–2015
Eliza Borné	2015–2021 (interim from May 2015)
Danielle Amir Jackson	2021–2024
Sara A. Lewis	2024–present (interim from June 2024)

== See also ==
- List of literary magazines
