= Cherrylog Road =

1963 poem by James Dickey

"Cherrylog Road" is a poem by James Dickey. Written in 1963, this is one of his more well-known poems. It first appeared in the October 1963 edition of The New Yorker but was also included in several collections of his poetry, including Helmets: Poems (1964), Poems, 1957–1967 (1967), The Whole Motion (1992), and James Dickey: The Selected Poems (1998).

== Themes and critical analysis ==
This poem follows a male speaker who is meeting a forbidden lover in a junkyard. According to the critical analysis of his poetry as a whole, Dickey's writing is comparable to that of Robert Lowell, especially when examining "Cherrylog Road." Dickey's poems usually relate to themes of self-hatred and self-pity, and almost always contain language relating to the American South, which is clear to see in this poem. Dickey pushes the poetic narrative and chooses to explore different poetic personas in poems like this and the others included in Poems, 1957–1967. The persona associated with his work in "Cherrylog Road" is that of a rebellious and sexual young man, which can be seen throughout multiple poems in that collection. One repeating motif throughout his poems is his use of comparing human and animal relations. Dickey continually attempts to use that comparison to balance the feelings of exultation and pure terror.

Another piece of imagery which carries much weight in this poem is the car in which the two lovers meet in the junkyard. The car that appears as part of the narrative in "Cherrylog Road" has certainly been a subject of interest for critical review. In this poem, Dickey is able to manipulate the reader into believing that they are in this intimate space with him and the secondary character in the piece, Doris Holbrook. The car lets us into this tight space with the speaker, allowing us to better understand him and how he is "wild to be wreckage forever." The car is used to showcase psychological and sexual closeness.
