= James Dickey =

American poet and novelist (1923–1997)

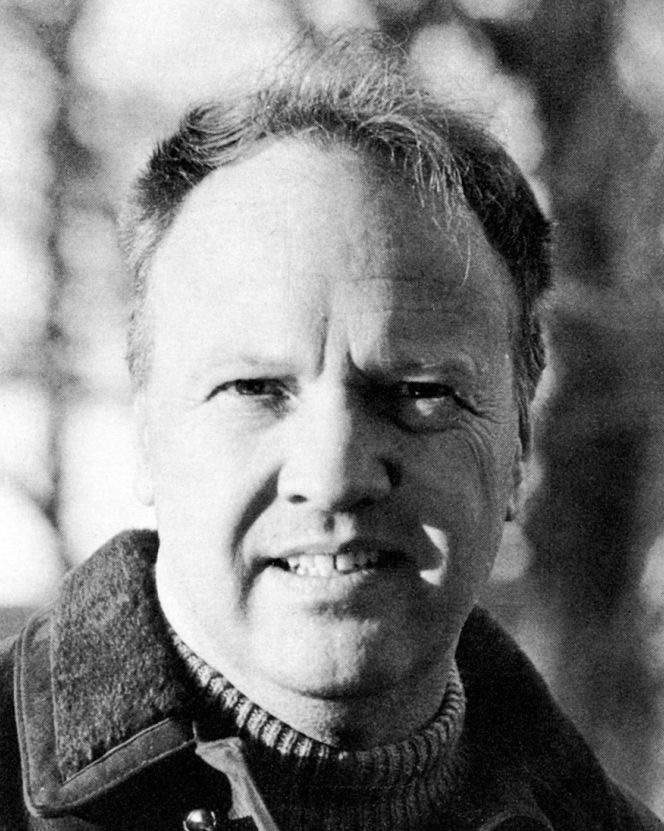
- Born: James Lafayette Dickey; February 2, 1923; Atlanta, Georgia, U.S.
- Died: January 19, 1997 (aged 73); Columbia, South Carolina, U.S.
- Education: Clemson University; Vanderbilt University (BA, MA)
- Occupations: Poet; novelist; critic; lecturer
- Spouses: Maxine Syerson (m. 1948; died 1976); Deborah Dodson (m. 1976)
- Children: 3; including Christopher and Bronwen
- Writing career
- Period: Contemporary literature
- Notable works: Deliverance; Buckdancer's Choice; Falling, May Day Sermon, and Other Poems; To the White Sea
- Notable awards: National Book Award for Poetry; Guggenheim Fellowship; United States Poet Laureate (1966–1968); Order of the South
- Military career
- Allegiance: United States
- Branch: United States Army; Army Air Forces; United States Air Force
- Service years: 1943–1946 (Army); 1952–1954 (Air Force)
- Units: Fifth Air Force; 418th Night Fighter Squadron
- Conflicts: World War II; Pacific War; New Guinea campaign; Philippines campaign; Borneo campaign; Korean War
- Awards: Bronze Star (5)

Signature
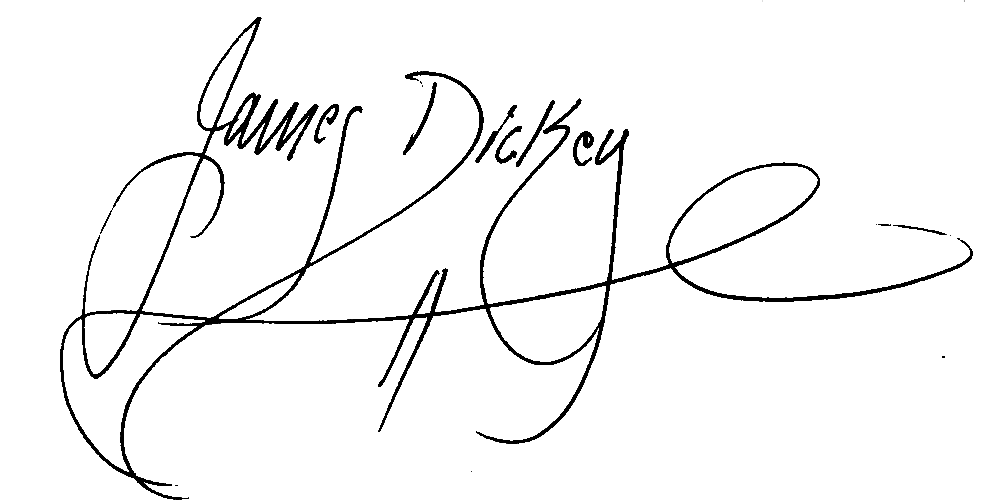

James Lafayette Dickey (February 2, 1923 – January 19, 1997) was an American poet, novelist, critic, and lecturer. He was appointed the 18th United States Poet Laureate in 1966. His other accolades included the National Book Award for Poetry and a Guggenheim Fellowship.

Although acclaimed as a poet, Dickey is most widely known for his debut novel Deliverance (1970), which he adapted into the acclaimed 1972 film of the same name. He was previously a decorated veteran of the Second World War and the Korean War, as a navigator in the United States Air Force's 418th Night Fighter Squadron.

== Early years ==
Dickey was born to lawyer Eugene Dickey and Maibelle Swift in Atlanta, Georgia, where he attended North Fulton High School in Atlanta's Buckhead neighborhood. After graduation from North Fulton High in 1941, Dickey completed a postgraduate year at Darlington School in Rome, Georgia. Dickey asked to be dismissed from the Darlington rolls in a 1981 letter to the principal, deeming the school the most "disgusting combination of cant, hypocrisy, cruelty, class privilege and inanity I have ever since encountered at any human institution." In 1942, he enrolled at Clemson Agricultural College of South Carolina and played on the football team as a tailback. After one semester, he left school to enlist in the armed services. During World War II, Dickey served with the U.S. Army Air Forces, where he flew thirty-eight missions in the Pacific Theater as a P-61 Black Widow navigator and radar operator with the 418th Night Fighter Squadron, an experience that influenced his work, and for which he was awarded five Bronze Stars. He later served in the U.S. Air Force during the Korean War. Between the wars, he attended Vanderbilt University, where he was elected to Phi Beta Kappa and graduated magna cum laude with a degree in English and philosophy (as well as minoring in astronomy) in 1949. He also received an M.A. in English from Vanderbilt in 1950.

== Career ==
Dickey taught as an instructor of English at Rice University (then Rice Institute) in Houston, Texas in 1950 and following his second Air Force stint, from 1952 to 1954, Dickey returned to academic teaching. Dickey then quit his teaching job at the University of Florida in the spring of 1956 after a group of the American Pen's Women's Society protested his reading of the poem called The Father's Body; he quit rather than apologize. Some critics believe that he manipulated this incident to his advantage. He became a successful copy writer for advertising agencies selling Coca-Cola and Lay's potato chips while in his free time writing some of his best poetry. He once said he embarked on his advertising career in order to "make some bucks." Dickey also said "I was selling my soul to the devil all day... and trying to buy it back at night." He was ultimately fired for shirking his work responsibilities.

His first book, Into the Stone and Other Poems, was published in 1960. Drowning with Others was published in 1962, which led to a Guggenheim Fellowship (Norton Anthology, The Literature of the American South). Buckdancer's Choice (1965) earned him a National Book Award for Poetry. Among his better-known poems are "The Performance", "Cherrylog Road", "The Firebombing", "May Day Sermon", "Falling", and "For The Last Wolverine".

He published his first volume of collected poems, Poems 1957-1967 in 1967 after being named a poetry consultant for the Library of Congress. This publication represents Dickey's best-known poetry. After serving as a visiting lecturer at several institutions from 1963 to 1968 (including Reed College, California State University, Northridge, the University of Wisconsin–Madison, the University of Wisconsin–Milwaukee, Washington University in St. Louis and the Georgia Institute of Technology), Dickey returned to academia in earnest in 1969 as a professor of English and writer-in-residence at the University of South Carolina, a position he held for the remainder of his life. It was there that he was also inducted into Omicron Delta Kappa, the National Leadership Honor Society, in 1970.

Dickey wrote the poem The Moon Ground for Life magazine in celebration of the Apollo 11 Moon landing. His reading of it was broadcast on ABC television on July 20, 1969.

His popularity exploded after the film version of his novel Deliverance was released in 1972. Dickey wrote the screenplay and had a cameo in the film as a sheriff.

On January 20, 1977, Dickey was invited to read his poem The Strength of Fields at the inauguration of Jimmy Carter.

== Personal life ==
In November 1948 Dickey married Maxine Syerson, and three years later they had their first son, Christopher; a second son, Kevin, was born in 1958.

Christopher Dickey was a novelist and journalist, providing coverage from the Middle East for Newsweek. In 1998, Christopher wrote a book about his father and Christopher's own sometimes troubled relationship with him, titled Summer of Deliverance. Christopher died in July 2020.

Kevin Dickey is an interventional radiologist and lives in Winston-Salem, NC.

Two months after Maxine died in 1976, Dickey married one of his students, Deborah Dodson. Their daughter, Bronwen, was born in 1981. Bronwen is an author, journalist, and lecturer. Her first book, Pit Bull: The Battle over an American Icon, was published in 2016.

=== Death ===
Dickey died on January 19, 1997, aged 73, six days after his last class at the University of South Carolina, where from 1969 he taught as poet in residence. Dickey spent his last years in and out of hospitals, afflicted with severe alcoholism, jaundice and later pulmonary fibrosis.

== Works ==
=== Publications ===
==== Novels ====
- — (September 10, 1994) [1970]. Deliverance (Reprint ed.). Alfred A. Knopf. ISBN 978-0-385-31387-2. LCCN 71100100. OCLC 472816545. OL 7439054M – via Internet Archive.
- — (May 5, 1987). Alnilam (First ed.). Doubleday. ISBN 978-0-385-06549-8. LCCN 86019699. OCLC 751299075. OL 2725934M – via Internet Archive.
- — (September 1, 1993). To the White Sea (First ed.). Houghton Mifflin. ISBN 978-0-395-47565-2. LCCN 93001247. OCLC 1132264321. OL 1394042M – via Internet Archive.

==== Poetry ====
- Into the Stone and Other Poems (in Poets of Today VII) (1960)
- Drowning with Others (1962)
- Two Poems of the Air (1964)
- Helmets (1964)
- Buckdancer's Choice: Poems (1965) —winner of the National Book Award
- Poems 1957-67 (1967)
- The Achievement of James Dickey: A Comprehensive Selection of His Poems (1968)
- The Eye-Beaters, Blood, Victory, Madness, Buckhead and Mercy (1970)
- Exchanges (1971)
- The Zodiac (1976)
- The Owl King (1977)
- Veteran Birth: The Gadfly Poems 1947-49 (1978)
- Tucky the Hunter (1978)
- Head-Deep in Strange Sounds: Free-Flight Improvisations from the unEnglish (1979)
- The Strength of Fields (1979)
- Falling, May Day Sermon, and Other Poems (1981)
- The Early Motion (1981)
- Puella (1982)
- Värmland (1982)
- False Youth: Four Seasons (1983)
- For a Time and Place (1983)
- Intervisions (1983)
- The Central Motion: Poems 1968-79 (1983)
- Bronwen, The Traw, and the Shape-Shifter: A Poem in Four Parts (1986)
- Summons (1988)
- The Eagle's Mile (1990)
- — (March 15, 1992). The Whole Motion: Collected Poems, 1945–1992. Wesleyan Poetry. Wesleyan University Press. ISBN 978-0-8195-2202-3. LCCN 91050811. OCLC 767498572. OL 1566756M – via Internet Archive.
- The Selected Poems (1998)
- The Complete Poems of James Dickey (2013)
- Death, and the Day's Light (2015)

==== Illustrated prose ====
- — (1979). In pursuit of the grey soul (Limited ed.). Bruccoli Clark. ISBN 978-0-89723-004-9. LCCN 79004224. OCLC 4804818. OL 4402809M.

==== Non-fiction ====
- Shuptrine, Hubert; — (January 1, 1974). Jericho: The South Beheld (First ed.). Oxmoor House. ISBN 978-1-125-34600-6. LCCN 74078763. OCLC 35987784. OL 8257523M.

=== Filmography ===
- —; Lowell, Robert (1970). Lord Let Me Die But Not Die Out | A James Dickey Documentary (Documentary film). Croner, Stanley (director). Atlanta, Georgia: Encyclopædia Britannica – via YouTube.
- Deliverance (novel / screenplay) (1972) - Sheriff Bullard (cameo film role)
- The Call of the Wild (screenplay) (1976)
