= Buckdancer's Choice =

1965 poetry collection by James Dickey

- Author: James Dickey
- Genre: Poetry
- Publisher: Wesleyan University Press
- Publication date: 1965

Buckdancer's Choice (1965) is a collection of poems by James Dickey. It won the U.S. National Book Award for Poetry in 1966 and the Melville Cane Award from the Poetry Society of America.

The opening poem, "The Firebombing," relates a World War II pilot's memory of a night air raid on Beppu, Japan. The New York Times reviewer Joseph Bennett called it "one of the most important long poems written postwar."

In the poem "Buckdancer's Choice," the narrator listens as his mother, dying of emphysema in an adjacent room, whistles an old fiddle tune. The poem first appeared in The New Yorker for June 19, 1965, alongside "Hapworth 16, 1924", the last published story by J. D. Salinger.
