= Christopher Dickey =

American journalist (1951–2020)

- Born: August 31, 1951; Nashville, Tennessee, United States
- Died: July 16, 2020 (aged 68); Paris, France
- Occupations: Journalist, author, and news editor
- Parent(s): Maxine Syerson and James Dickey
- Family: Carol Dickey (wife); James Dickey (son); Bronwen Dickey (sister); Kevin Dickey (brother)
- Website: christopherdickey.com

Christopher Swift Dickey (August 31, 1951 – July 16, 2020) was an American journalist, author, and news editor. He was the Paris-based world news editor for The Daily Beast. He authored seven books, including Our Man in Charleston: Britain's Secret Agent in the Civil War South (2015); Securing the City: Inside America's Best Counterterror Force – the NYPD (2009), and a memoir, Summer of Deliverance (1998), about his father, the poet/novelist James Dickey.

== Early years ==
Christopher Dickey was born on August 31, 1951, in Nashville, Tennessee, to Maxine (Syerson) Dickey and American poet/novelist James Dickey. During his early years, his family moved to Atlanta, France, Italy, Oregon, and Virginia. In 1972, Dickey received his bachelor of arts degree from the University of Virginia. In 1974, he received his master's degree in documentary filmmaking from Boston University.

== Career ==
Dickey's career as a foreign correspondent began when he was named Mexico and Central America Bureau Chief for The Washington Post in 1980 after he had spent six years in various editing and writing positions at the paper. Over the following three decades for The Washington Post and then for Newsweek, he covered wars in Central America and the Middle East, with occasional forays into Africa and the Balkans. From his experiences in the field he produced the non-fiction books of reportage, With the Contras: A Reporter in the Wilds of Nicaragua (1986) and Expats: Travels in Arabia from Tripoli to Tehran (1990), as well as two novels, Innocent Blood (1997) and its sequel, The Sleeper (2004). The New York Times Book Review selected With the Contras, Summer of Deliverance, and Securing the City as notable books of the year in 1986, 1998, and 2009, respectively.

From 2010 to 2013, after Newsweek was acquired by IAC, Dickey worked for both Newsweek and The Daily Beast as Paris bureau chief and Middle East editor but stayed with The Daily Beast when Newsweek was sold a third time. In March 2014, he was named world news editor for The Daily Beast.

In 1983–84, Dickey was an Edward R. Murrow Fellow at the Council on Foreign Relations. Articles and essays by Dickey have appeared in Foreign Affairs, Foreign Policy, The New York Times Book Review, The New York Review of Books, Vanity Fair, Departures, and many other publications.

Robert De Niro's Tribeca Productions optioned Securing the City in the fall of 2009, to develop into a television series. The Christopher Dickey Award is named after him.

== Personal life ==
Dickey married Susan Tuckerman, daughter of Massachusetts politician and horseman Bayard Tuckerman Jr., in 1969. The couple had one son, James Bayard Tuckerman Dickey. The couple divorced in 1979. In 1980, Dickey married his second wife, Carol Salvatore.

== Death ==
Christopher Dickey died of heart failure in Paris on July 16, 2020, aged 68.

== Works ==
=== Nonfiction ===
- With the Contras: A Reporter in the Wilds of Nicaragua (1986) ISBN 978-0-571-14604-8
- Expats: Travels in Arabia, from Tripoli to Teheran (1990) ISBN 978-1-872180-84-7
- Securing the City: Inside America's Best Counter-Terror Force - the NYPD (2009) ISBN 978-1-4165-5240-6
- Our Man in Charleston: Britain's Secret Agent in the Civil War South (2015) ISBN 978-0-307-88727-6

=== Fiction ===
- Innocent Blood (1997) ISBN 978-0-684-84200-4
- The Sleeper (2004) ISBN 978-0-7432-5877-7

=== Memoir ===
- Summer of Deliverance: A Memoir of Father and Son (1998) ISBN 978-0-684-84202-8
