= DogsBite.org =

Organization publishing Dog Bite Related Fatalities

- Formation: October 2007; 19 years ago
- Founder: Colleen Lynn
- Legal status: Non-profit, 501(c)(3) organization
- Purpose: Dog bite fatality statistics; victim advocacy; dog breed-specific legislation
- Website: dogsbite.org

DogsBite.org is a nonprofit organization that publishes accounts of and compiles statistics of dog bite related fatalities throughout the United States, victim testimonies, an overview of breed-specific legislation within the United States, and advocates for victims of dog bites by promoting breed-specific legislation as a means to reduce serious dog attacks. The organization provides statistics and information to news organizations and has filed amicus briefs in court cases related to breed-specific legislation. The organization has been criticized for publishing misleading or inaccurate information.

== History ==
After being injured by a pit bull during an attack while jogging on June 17, 2007, DogsBite.org founder Colleen Lynn researched dog bites and attacks, and anonymously launched Dogsbite.org in October 2007. Shortly after, Lynn's identity was revealed and she received harassment, including the threat of a lawsuit.

== Activities ==
DogsBite.org documents and publishes accounts dog bite related fatalities from media reports. The organization tracks various factors for each attack incident including information about the attacking dog being from a shelter or rescue adoption. The organization wrote an amicus curiae for the case Tracey v. Solesky, 50 A. 3d 1075 - Md: Court of Appeals 2012, and in February 2013 Coleen Lynn testified to the Judicial Proceedings Committee of the Maryland Senate in opposition of Senate Bill 247.

DogsBite.org's website says that it is "genetics that leaves pit bull victims with permanent and disfiguring injuries.", and advocates for breed-specific legislation on a genetic basis. DogsBite's position on breed-specific legislation (BSL) is that it is effective at preventing attacks and injuries, which they say the reduced population numbers of affected breeds lowers overall biting incidents. They advocate that BSL should be enacted at the state level in all 50 states. Their website provides information on pit bull regulations in military housing and in over 900 cities. Lynn says they support laws that specifically regulate pit bulls because of the number of fatalities caused, the nature of the injuries, and the severity of the attacks; she also states that even though pit bulls are a minority of dogs owned, they were responsible for 64% of the deaths in 2014. The American Veterinary Medical Association, and other organizations have published positions opposing breed-specific legislation (BSL).

In her book Pit Bull: The Battle over an American Icon, author Bronwen Dickey writes that DogsBite.org accuses several organizations of being "co-opted by the 'pit bull lobby', a shady cabal that supporters of the site imply is financed by dogfighters." In an interview with Psychology Today, Dickey says "The site's founder is also contemptuous of people in the relevant sciences, including those at the AVMA, the CDC, the Animal Behavior Society, etc. She refers to them as 'science whores,' which alone is enough to discredit her claims."

In an article in the Journal of the American Veterinary Medical Association, R. Scott Nolen states that "DogsBite.org's claim that pit bull–type dogs were responsible for 65 percent of the deaths during that 12-year period (2005-2016) is disputed by some groups as inaccurate and misleading. The American Veterinary Society of Animal Behavior, for example, says identifying a dog's breed accurately is difficult, even for professionals, and visual recognition is known to not always be reliable."

Radio Canada accused DogsBite.org of being critical of scientific experts and of using the term "science whore". Colleen Lynn, the site's founder, responded by saying that the term does not come from her and that it has only been used three times since the creation of the site in 2007. Radio Canada also criticized DogsBite.org for counting as a death caused by pit bulls the death of a man who died in 2007 from atherosclerosis and problems with alcohol four months after he was severely injured by pit bulls.
