= Jamie Quatro =

American fiction writer

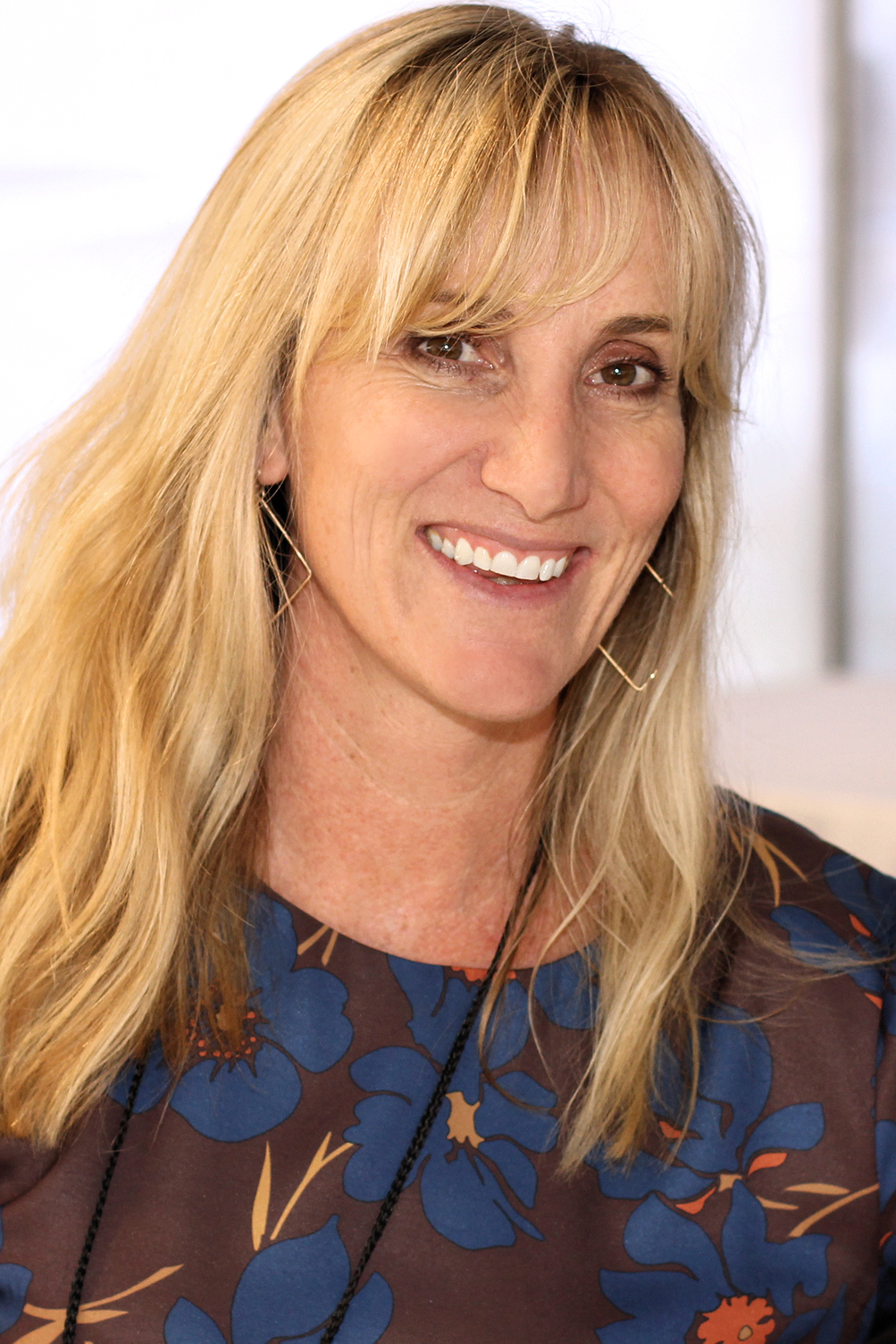
- Quatro at the 2018 Texas Book Festival
- Education: College of William & Mary; Bennington College
- Occupations: Short story writer, novelist
- Writing career
- Language: English
- Website: www.jamiequatro.com

Jamie Quatro is an American fiction writer. Her debut story collection, I Want to Show You More, was published by Grove Press in 2013. Her first novel, Fire Sermon, was published in 2018.

I Want to Show You More was a New York Times Notable Book, NPR Best Book of 2013, Indie Next pick, O, The Oprah Magazine summer reading pick, and New York Times Editors’ Choice.

Quatro is a contributing editor for the magazine Oxford American. and teaches at Sewanee, The University of the South.

== Bibliography ==
=== Books ===
- I Want to Show You More. 2013. ISBN 978-0-8021-2075-5.
- Fire Sermon. New York: Grove Press. 2018. ISBN 978-0-8021-2704-4.
- Quatro, Jamie (2024). Two-step Devil. Grove Press. ISBN 978-0-8021-6313-4..

=== Critical studies and reviews of Quatro's work ===
Fire sermon

- Dederer, Claire (Mar 2018). "The virtue of illicit desire". The Culture File. Books. The Atlantic. 321 (2): 42–44.

I want to show you more

- Wood, James (March 11, 2013). "Broken vows : Jamie Quatro's stories". The Critics. Books. The New Yorker. Vol. 89, no. 4. pp. 72–74.
