= Roger Hodge =

American editor (born 1967)

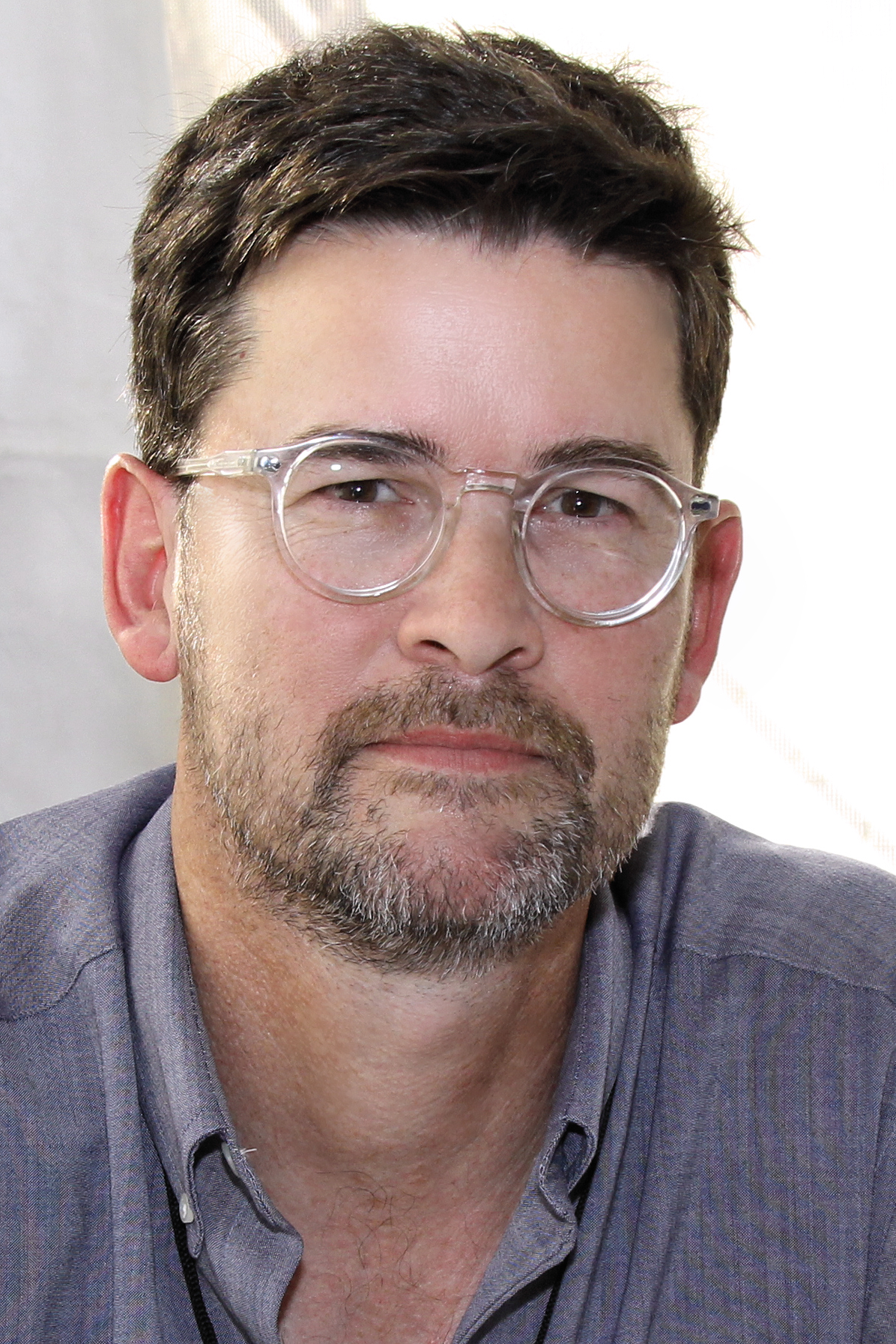
Hodge at the 2017 Texas Book Festival

Roger D. Hodge (born 1967 in Del Rio, Texas, U.S.) is Deputy Editor at The Intercept. He was the editor of Harper's Magazine from March 2006 through January 2010. He was the editor of the Oxford American from 2012–2015.

== Early life ==
Hodge attended the University of the South, where he majored in comparative literature. He began graduate work at the New School for Social Research and completed a master's degree in philosophy, but joined Harper's before finishing his dissertation.

== Career ==
=== Harper's Magazine ===
Hodge first came to Harper's as an intern in 1996 and was subsequently hired as a fact checker. Hodge edited the Harper's Reading section from 1999 until 2003.

In December 2000, Hodge orchestrated the relaunch of the magazine's website, Harpers.org, and created the popular "Weekly Review", a deadpan satire of the twenty-four-hour news cycle. In December 2003 he oversaw another radical redesign of Harpers.org; that month he also began writing a monthly print column, "Findings", a sardonic portrait of recent medical, scientific, and environmental developments, which he continued to write until 2007. Hodge was named deputy editor of the magazine in November 2004, and in April 2006 he replaced Lewis H. Lapham as editor.

The publisher of Harper's, John R. MacArthur, fired Hodge as editor in January 2010. At first, MacArthur claimed that Hodge was stepping down for "personal reasons", but was later forced to admit that he indeed fired Hodge. "I misspoke," MacArthur explained. "I should have just stuck to, it's personal, it's between him and me."

During Hodge's tenure Harper's received eight National Magazine Award finalist nominations; the magazine won the National Magazine Award for General Excellence in 2006 and the Award for Fiction in 2008. His writings there include "Blood and Time: Cormac McCarthy and the Twilight of the West", which appeared in February 2006 and was a National Magazine Award finalist for Reviews and Criticism.

Hodge's final issue as editor was the March 2010 issue, which included a widely praised report by Scott Horton: "The Guantánamo 'Suicides': A Camp Delta Sergeant Blows the Whistle". That article presents evidence from four named U.S. Military Intelligence guards, including a decorated sergeant, that three Guantánamo Bay prisoners who allegedly committed suicide in 2006 were most likely killed in a secret "black site" known to American soldiers as "Camp No".

=== Bibliography ===
==== Books ====
| Year | Title |
|---|---|
| 2010 | The Mendacity of Hope: Barack Obama and the Betrayal of American Liberalism |
| 2017 | Texas Blood: Seven Generations Among the Outlaws, Ranchers, Indians, Missionaries, Soldiers, and Smugglers of the Borderlands. |

== Awards ==
| Year | Title | Result |
|---|---|---|
| 2007 | National Magazine Award for Criticism | Finalist |
| 2018 | Texas Institute of Letters Nonfiction Award | Winner |
