= Claire Dederer =

American writer

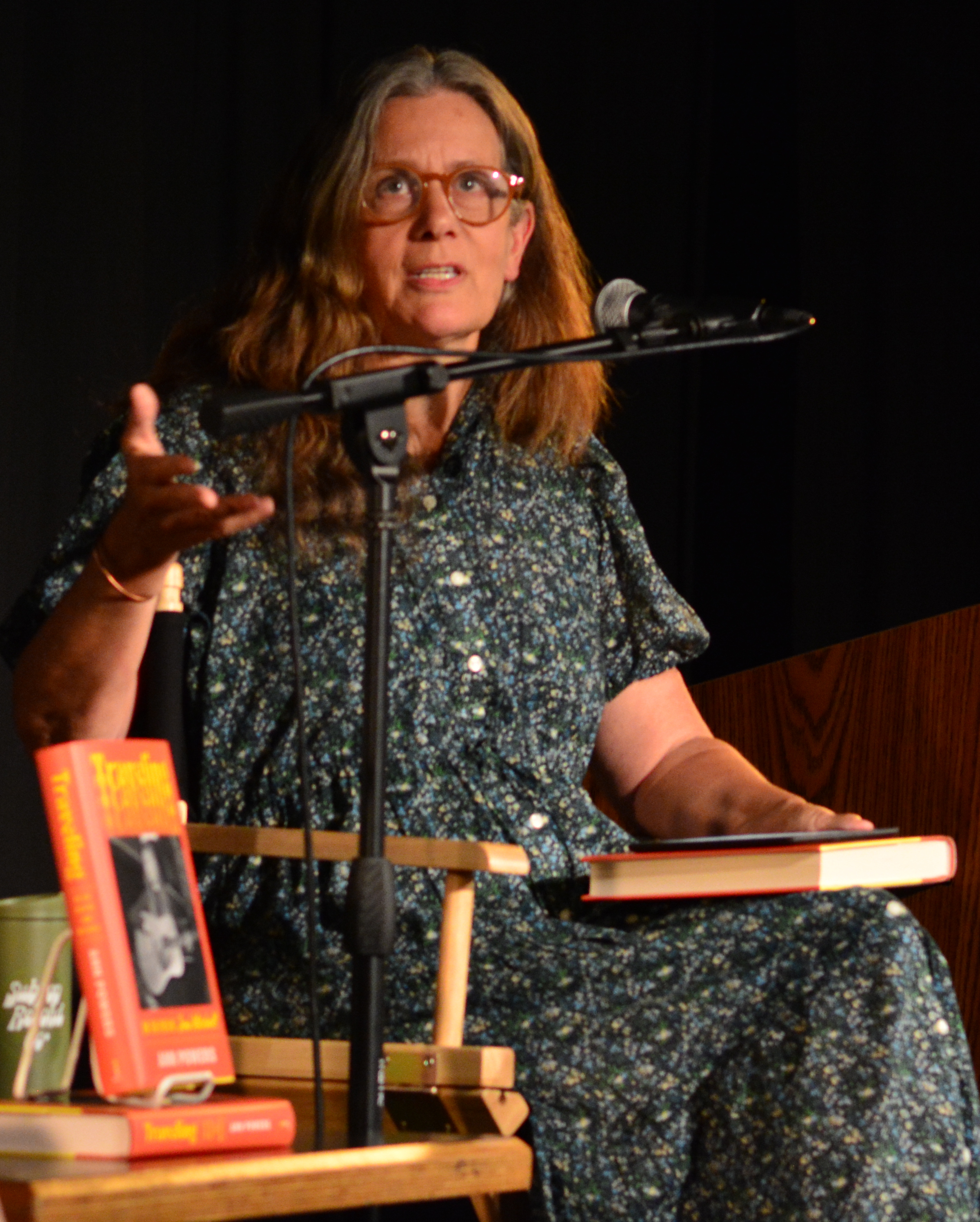
- Claire Dederer, 2024
- Born: January 6, 1967 (age 59); Seattle, Washington, U.S.
- Citizenship: American
- Education: University of Washington
- Occupations: Writer, essayist, critic
- Known for: Essays, book reviews, memoirs
- Notable work: Poser: My Life in Twenty-Three Yoga Poses, Love and Trouble: A Midlife Reckoning, Monsters: A Fan's Dilemma
- Spouse: Bruce Barcott (married 1997–2023) Peter Ames Carlin (married 2025–present)
- Children: 2
- Relatives: Dave Dederer (brother)
- Awards: Longform essay of the year (2017) 2024 Christopher Isherwood Prize for Autobiographical Prose 2025 Chowdhury Prize in Literature
- Website: clairedederer.com

Claire Dederer (born 1967) is an American writer who regularly contributes essays, reviews and criticism to publications including The New York Times.

She has written three books: Love and Trouble: A Midlife Reckoning, Poser: My Life in Twenty-Three Yoga Poses, and Monsters: A Fan's Dilemma.

== Life and career ==
Dederer was raised in Seattle, where she was born in 1967. She was a film critic at the Seattle Weekly before turning to freelance journalism. She has taught writing at her alma mater ('93), the University of Washington. She has two adult children with her ex-husband. She lives on a boat in Seattle.

Dederer has written book reviews and articles for The New York Times and other publications. Her memoir, Love and Trouble: A Midlife Reckoning, was published in 2017.

Her brother, Dave Dederer, is a guitarist and singer, best known as a member of the band The Presidents of the United States of America.

Dederer currently teaches in the Master of Fine Arts in Writing program at Pacific University.

== Works ==
=== Books ===
- Poser: My Life in Twenty-three Yoga Poses. Farrar, Straus and Giroux. 2010. ISBN 9780374236441.
- Love and Trouble: A Midlife Reckoning. Alfred A. Knopf. 2017. ISBN 9781101946503.
- Monsters: A Fan's Dilemma. Hodder & Stoughton. 2023. ISBN 9781399715034.

=== Essays ===
- "What Do We Do with the Art of Monstrous Men?". The Paris Review. November 20, 2017. (Winner of Longform essay of the year)

=== Book reviews ===
Year	Review article	Work(s) reviewed
2018	"The virtue of illicit desire". The Culture File. Books. The Atlantic. 321 (2): 42–44. Mar 2018.	Quatro, Jamie (2018). Fire sermon. Grove.
