= Bronwen Dickey =

American writer

- Born: May 17, 1981 (age 45); Columbia, South Carolina, United States
- Occupations: Author; journalist
- Parents: Deborah Dodson (mother); James Dickey (father)
- Relatives: Christopher Dickey (brother); Kevin Dickey (brother)
- Writing career
- Period: Contemporary literature
- Notable work: Pit Bull: The Battle over an American Icon
- Notable awards: Lowell Thomas Award
- Website: www.bronwendickey.com

Bronwen Dickey (born, May 17, 1981) is an American author, journalist, and lecturer.

== Education ==
Bronwen Dickey obtained an MFA in Non-fiction Writing from Columbia University in 2009.

== Authorship ==
Dickey is a contributing editor at The Oxford American and the author of Pit Bull: The Battle over an American Icon. Her book attempted to show that negative views about the breed have often been shaped by misunderstandings of pit bulls and their history. This led to her unwittingly becoming a "heroine" for the pro-pit bull community and the target of threats and harassment from those who see her as an "apologist" for what they regard as a "vicious animal."

She was a finalist for the 2017 National Magazine Award in feature writing and won a Lowell Thomas Award in the category "Magazine Article on U.S./Canada Travel".

== Academia ==
Dickey is a Visiting Lecturer on Journalism and Public Policy at Duke University.

== Personal life ==
She lives in North Carolina. She is the youngest child of the late poet and novelist James Dickey.
