= Armed Forces Foundation =

U.S. non-profit organization

- Formation: 2001; 25 years ago
- Dissolved: October 15, 2016; 10 years ago
- Tax ID no.: 75-3070368
- Legal status: Non-Profit registered 501c(3) Foundation
- Purpose: United States Armed Forces; Mental health
- Region served: United States
- Leader: Brian Cooke
- Main organ: Board of Directors
- Website: armedforcesfoundation.org

The Armed Forces Foundation was an American non-profit organization based in Washington, D.C., which was founded in 2002 by Jim Gorab, a former Navy Seabee, to promote the morale, welfare and quality of life of the military community with a special emphasis on military families. In 2003, new leadership assumed management of the organization, however, due to issues related to an audit, the operations of the Armed Forces Foundation ceased on October 15, 2016.

== Armed Forces Foundation ceases operation ==
On October 15, 2016, the Armed Forces Foundation made an announcement that they were ceasing operations after performing an audit of operations as a result of Patricia Driscoll’s resignation on June 14, 2015 and the subsequent indictment of the former President on federal charges stemming from a scheme in which she allegedly stole from the non-profit charity, defrauded donors, and lied to the Internal Revenue Service (IRS) and the public about her salary and benefits.

== Programs ==
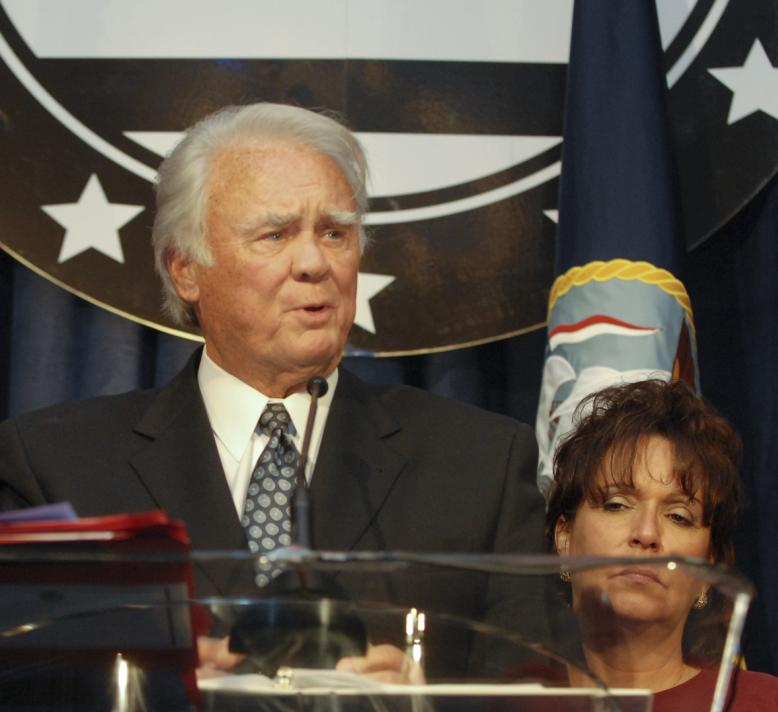
Congressman C.W Bill Young of Florida with his wife Beverly speak at the 2008 Armed Forces Foundation's Congressional Gala.

The Honorable C.W Bill Young Financial Assistance Fund, named after former Congressman Bill Young, once provided direct financial assistance to service members and their families facing financial hardship through injury and other service related situations.

The Armed Forces Foundation, in partnership with Southwest Airlines, once paid for the Wounded Warrior Amputee Softball Team's travel expenses during the season. The team consists of 29 veterans and active duty soldiers with a variety of injuries.

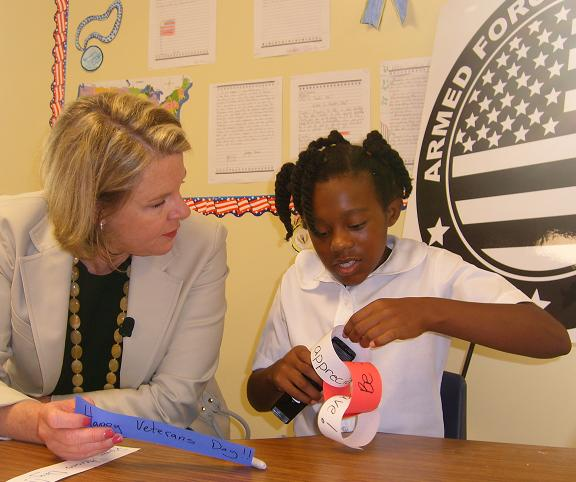
Secretary of Education Margaret Spellings with a child during the Armed Forces Foundation's Operation Caring Classroom

Operation Caring Classroom was the foundation's annual Veterans Day education initiative to help increase understanding and support among children for military families across the United States.

Started in 2009, the NASCAR Troops to the Track program (T2T), presented by Bank of America in partnership with the Armed Forces Foundation, is a year-round recreational group therapy program that honors service men and women, veterans, and military families at races throughout the country by taking them to races and behind-the-scenes events.

Starting in 2012, Kurt Busch and the Armed Forces Foundation dedicated races in memory or in honor service members and veterans. On November 7, 2014 the program was suspended due to allegations of assault by Busch against Patricia Driscoll, who at the time was the President of the AFF and his former girlfriend. On March 5, 2015, it was announced by the Delaware District Attorney that no criminal charges would be filed against Busch, citing a lack of evidence.

== Controversies ==
=== Misappropriation of funds allegations ===
Patricia Driscoll served as President of the Armed Forces Foundation from 2003 to 2015.

According to the ESPN's OTL, Patricia Driscoll, the former girlfriend of NASCAR driver Kurt Busch, resigned as executive director of the Armed Forces Foundation on June 14, 2015 in the wake of allegations that she mishandled foundation money, according to ESPN’s Outside the Lines and Kickin' The Tires
