= Automated Flight Following =

Automated Flight Following (AFF) is GPS aircraft tracking that is mandated by a government agency (or other governing body) for its contractors. The following criteria must be met:

- The GPS device must transmit position reports every two minutes;
- The position reports must be pushed into the third-party database (where they are automatically tracked by dispatchers).

A common use for AFF devices is to track planes flying for the USDA or utility companies during fire season.
