= Pit Bull: The Battle over an American Icon =

2016 book

- Author: Bronwen Dickey
- Language: English
- Genre: Science & Nature
- Publisher: Knopf
- Publication date: 10 May 2016
- Publication place: United States
- Media type: Print (hardback and paperback)
- Pages: 336
- ISBN: 9780307961761

Pit Bull: The Battle over an American Icon by Bronwen Dickey is a book about the history of pit bulls in the United States.

== Content ==
The book examines the mixed sentiment towards the pit bull breed by the American public and how the media has affected that perception. Dickey spent seven years researching the topic and interviewed hundreds of people ranging from animal behaviorists to trainers.

== Reception ==
The book received a mostly positive reception from critics.

The Wall Street Journal said that "Ms. Dickey has earned her reputation as a first-rate reporter.” The New York Times stated that "Dickey not only writes about the ebb and flow of public fear and loathing, she takes the reader on a thoroughly comprehensible tour of genetics and behavioral science to explain why breeding never guarantees an individual dog's personality, and shouldn't be used to condemn it."

The Christian Science Monitor called it “brilliant" and "a powerful and disturbing book that shows how the rise of the killer-pit bull narrative reflects many broader American anxieties and pathologies surrounding race, class, and poverty."

Anti-pit bull advocates accused Dickey of downplaying the potential danger of pit bull dogs. She also received death threats at book signings.
