= Third-party technique =

Marketing strategy

Third-party technique is a marketing strategy employed by public relations (PR) firms, that involves placing a premeditated message in the "mouth of the media." Third-party technique can take many forms, ranging from the hiring of journalists to report the organization in a favorable light, to using scientists within the organization to present their perhaps prejudicial findings to the public.

Industry-sponsored groups used to relay these findings to the public are known as front groups. These groups claim to represent the general public’s agenda, when in reality they are facilitating the hidden interests of the organizations that are sponsoring them. Also related are astroturf groups, which are groups that have been formed by the industry, yet appear to have been formed by ordinary citizens.

== Background ==
Edward Bernays, the “father of public relation,” is also said to be the founder of using front groups as marketing techniques. Bernays qualified the use of a reputable and prominent sponsoring groups in the statement, “The most useful method in a multiple society like ours to indicate the support of an idea of the many varied elements that make up our society. Opinion leaders and group leaders have an effect in a democracy and stand as symbols to their constituency."

== Practice ==
The recent rise of the use of third-party technique has spurred the creation of groups such as PR Watch, an organization that investigates and combats manipulative and misleading PR messages. Third-party technique is often found within the drug and pharmaceutical industry. Journalists that may mistakenly report on these front groups' findings can unknowingly perpetuate the spread of biased information. The result is the perpetual exposure of doctors and patients to these carefully crafted messages.

In defense of the practice of third-party technique, public relations firms often qualify the use of a third-party to report on information as not putting words in the mouth of the media, but simply as mechanisms to display accurate information in a manner that the public will not see as biased towards the organization. "Developing third party support and validation for the basic risk messages of the corporation is essential. This support should ideally come from medical authorities, political leaders, union officials, relevant academics, fire and police officials, environmentalists, regulators,” says Amanda Little from the world’s fifth largest PR firm, Burson-Marsteller.
