= Injury Prevention (journal) =

- Discipline: Traumatology
- Language: English
- Edited by: Caroline Finch

Publication details
- History: 1995-present
- Publisher: BMJ Publishing Group
- Frequency: Bimonthly
- Impact factor: 1.9 (2025)

Standard abbreviations
- ISO 4: Inj. Prev.

Indexing
- ISSN: 1353-8047 (print); 1475-5785 (web)
- LCCN: 2004211020
- OCLC no.: 32910739

Links
- Journal homepage; Online access; Online archive

Injury Prevention is a bimonthly peer-reviewed medical journal covering the prevention of injuries in all age groups, including child and adolescent injuries. It is published by the BMJ Group and its editor-in-chief is Roderick J. McClure (University of New England). The journal is abstracted and indexed by CINAHL, MEDLINE, Scopus, and the Science Citation Index Expanded. According to the Journal Citation Reports, the journal has a 2023 impact factor of 2.5.
