= Closed-head injury =

Type of traumatic brain injury where the skull and dura mater remain intact

Closed-head injury is a type of traumatic brain injury in which the skull and dura mater remain intact. Closed-head injuries are the leading cause of death in children under 4 years old and the most common cause of physical disability and cognitive impairment in young people. Overall, closed-head injuries and other forms of mild traumatic brain injury account for about 75% of the estimated 1.7 million brain injuries that occur annually in the United States. Brain injuries such as closed-head injuries may result in lifelong physical, cognitive, or psychological impairment and, thus, are of utmost concern with regard to public health.

== Symptoms ==
If symptoms of a head injury are seen after an accident, medical care is necessary to diagnose and treat the injury. Without medical attention, injuries can progress and cause further brain damage, disability, or death.

=== Common symptoms ===
Because the brain swelling that produces these symptoms is often a slow process, these symptoms may not surface for days to weeks after the injury. Common symptoms of a closed-head injury include:

- headache
- dizziness
- nausea
- vomiting
- slurred speech

=== Severe injury symptoms ===
Severe head injuries can lead to permanent vegetative states or death, therefore being able to recognize symptoms and get medical attention is very important. Symptoms of a severe closed-head injury include:

- coma or vegetative states
- seizures or convulsions
- loss of consciousness

=== Secondary symptoms ===
Secondary symptoms are symptoms that surface during rehabilitation from the injury including social competence issues, depression, personality changes, cognitive disabilities, anxiety, and changes in sensory perception. More than 50% of patients who suffer from a traumatic brain injury will develop psychiatric disturbances. Although precise rates of anxiety after brain injury are unknown, a 30-year follow-up study of 60 patients found 8.3% of patients developed a panic disorder, 1.7% developed an anxiety disorder, and 8.3% developed a specific phobia. Patients recovering from a closed-head or traumatic brain injury often suffer from decreased self-esteem and depression. This effect is often attributed to difficulties re-entering society and frustration with the rehabilitation process. Patients who have suffered head injuries also show higher levels of unemployment, which can lead to the development of secondary symptoms.

== Causes ==
Closed-head injuries are caused primarily by vehicular accidents, falls, acts of violence, and sports injuries. Falls account for 35.2% of brain injuries in the United States, with rates highest for children ages 0–4 years and adults ages 75 years and older. Head injuries are more common in men than women across every age group. Boys aged 0–4 years have the highest rates of brain injury related hospital visits, hospitalizations, and deaths combined. Multiple mild traumatic brain injuries sustained over a short period of time (hours to weeks), often seen with sports-related injuries, can result in major neurological or cognitive deficits or fatality.

Blast-related traumatic brain injuries are often closed-head injuries and result from rapid changes in atmospheric pressure, objects dislodged by the blast hitting people, or people being thrown into motion by the blast. Even in the absence of blunt trauma to the head, research has shown that blast exposure can lead to damage of both the grey matter and white matter of the brain, which can contribute to neurodegenerative disease. Blast-related injuries have shown a recent increase in occurrence with the return of veterans from Iraq such that traumatic brain injury has been coined the "signature injury" of Operation Iraqi Freedom.

Closed-head injuries can range from mild injuries to debilitating traumatic brain injuries and can lead to severe brain damage or death. Common closed-head injuries include:

- concussion – a head injury resulting in temporary dysfunction of normal brain function. Almost half of the total concussions reported each year are sports-related.
- intracranial hematoma – a condition in which a blood vessel ruptures causing a pool of blood to form around the brain (subdural hematoma) or between the brain and the skull (epidural hematoma). Intracranial hematoma causes an increase in pressure on the brain and requires immediate medical attention.
- cerebral contusion – a bruise to the brain tissue as a result of trauma. Contusions are local in nature, separating them from concussions.
- diffuse axonal injury – These injuries are frequently seen in car accidents and cause permanent damage to the brain. Severe diffuse axonal injuries often lead to comas or vegetative states.

== Diagnosis ==
=== Classification ===
==== Glasgow Coma Scale ====
The Glasgow Coma Scale is commonly used to assess the severity of traumatic brain injuries, including closed-head injuries. The scale tests a patient's eye, verbal, and motor responses. The scale goes up to fifteen points; with fifteen being the most mild injury, less than eight being a severe brain injury, and three being a vegetative state.

==== ASCOT ====
The ASCOT probability of survival encapsulates several of the variables measured in the Glasgow Coma Scale but also includes systolic blood pressure, respiration rates upon admission, and anatomic injuries. The ASCOT was found to be the most sensitive tool for determining severity of head injuries in children and is effective in predicting the outcome of injury.

==== Mechanism based ====
A mechanism-based TBI classification system divides traumatic brain injuries (TBI) into closed and penetrating head trauma; based on the way in which the person was injured.

== Treatments ==
There are several different types of treatment available to those who have suffered a closed-head injury. The treatment type chosen can depend on several factors including the type and severity of injury as well as the effects that injury has on the patient. The course of treatment differs for each patient and can include several types of treatment, depending on the patient's specific needs. Early treatment is vital to recovering lost motor function after an injury, but cognitive abilities can be recovered regardless of time past since injury. Virtual reality-based therapy allows patients to engage in exercise in a different capacity, especially when in the acute stage of recovery. It has been found that early intervention using virtual reality therapy has drastically improved the mobility of patients who sustained a closed brain injury. Physical activity has also been an effective form of treatment to allow patients to regain some motor and coordination skills.

=== Pharmacotherapy ===
Pharmacotherapy is the utilization of drugs to treat an illness. There are several different drugs that have been used to alleviate symptoms experienced after a head injury including anti-depressants such as amitriptyline and sertraline. Use of these drugs has been associated with a decrease in depression and increased functioning in social and work environments. An antidiuretic called Desmopressin Acetate (DDAVP) has also been shown to improve memory performance in patients Recent studies have examined the preventative effects of progesterone on brain injuries. Phase III trials are currently being conducted at 17 medical centers across the United States. Preliminary results have shown a 50% reduction in mortality in those treated with progesterone and showed an improved functional outcome. Overall, the efficacy of pharmacotherapeutic treatments is dependent on the treatment being used and the symptoms being targeted by the treatment.

=== Patient education ===
Patient education has been shown to be one of the most effective ways to decrease secondary symptoms seen with closed-head injuries. Patient education often includes working with a therapist to review symptom management and learn about returning to regular activities. Educational initiatives have also been shown to decrease the occurrence of PTSD in head-injury survivors.

=== Cognitive rehabilitation ===
Many patients with severe injuries need therapy to regain basic motor and cognitive skills. Cognitive rehabilitation aims to improve attention, memory function, and cognitive-processing speed. The type of rehabilitation used is tailored to the patient's clinical needs depending on the severity and type of injury sustained. Early intervention is critical in improving cognitive ability and allowing patients to return to a life of independence.

=== Other ===
Other types of rehabilitation focus on raising patient's self-esteem by giving him tasks that can be successfully completed despite any cognitive changes as a result of the brain injury. This process can help decrease secondary symptoms such as feelings of worthlessness, depression, and social anxiety. Some rehabilitation programs use team-building exercises and problem-solving activities to help the patients learn to work with their disabilities.

== Prevention ==
Many closed-head injuries can be prevented by proper use of safety equipment during dangerous activities. Common safety features that can reduce the likelihood of experiencing a brain injury include helmets, hard hats, car seats, and safety belts. Another safety precaution that can decrease a person's risk for brain injury is not to drink and drive or allow oneself to be driven by a person who has been drinking or who is otherwise impaired.

Helmets can be used to decrease closed-head injuries acquired during athletic activities, and are considered necessary for sports such as American "tackle" football, where frequent head impacts are a normal part of the game. However, recent studies have questioned the effectiveness of even American football helmets, where the assumed protection of helmets promotes far more head impacts, a behavior known as risk compensation. The net result seems to have been an increase, not decrease, in injuries. The similar sports of Australian-rules football and rugby are always played helmetless, and see far fewer traumatic brain injuries. (See Australian rules football injuries.)

Bicycle helmets are perhaps the most promoted variety of helmet, based on the assumption that cycling without a helmet is a dangerous activity, with a large risk of serious brain injury. However, available data clearly shows that to be false. Cycling (with approximately 700 American fatalities per year from all medical causes) is a very minor source of fatal traumatic brain injury, whose American total is approximately 52,000 per year. Similarly, bicycling causes only 3% of America's non-fatal traumatic brain injury.

Still, bicycle-helmet promotion campaigns are common, and many U.S jurisdictions have enacted mandatory bicycle-helmet laws for children. A few such jurisdictions, a few Canadian provinces, plus Australia and New Zealand mandate bicycle helmets even for adults. A bicycle-helmet educational campaign directed toward children claimed an increase in helmet use from 5.5% to 40.2% leading to a claimed decrease in bicycle-related head injuries by nearly 67%. However, other sources have shown that bicycle-helmet promotion reduces cycling, often with no per-cyclist reduction in traumatic brain injury.

Estimates of bicycle-helmet use by American adults vary. One study found that only 25-30% of American adults wear helmets while riding bicycles, despite decades of promotion and despite sport cyclists' adoption of helmets as part of their uniform.

Following the commercial (as opposed to public-health) success of bicycle helmets, there have been successful attempts to promote the sale of ski helmets. Again, results have been less than impressive, with great increases in helmet use yielding no reduction in fatalities, and with most injury reduction confined to lacerations, contusions, and minor concussions, as opposed to more serious head injuries.

There have been rare campaigns for motoring helmets. Unfortunately, just as people greatly overestimate the traumatic brain injury danger of bicycling, they greatly underestimate the risk of motoring, which remains the largest source of traumatic brain injury in the developed world, despite the protective effects of seatbelts and airbags.

== See also ==
- Cerebral contusion
- Concussion
- Diffuse axonal injury
- Intracranial hemorrhage
- Traumatic brain injury
