= Concussion =

- Other names: Mild brain injury, mild traumatic brain injury (mTBI), mild head injury (MHI), minor head trauma
- Acceleration (g-forces) can exert rotational forces in the brain, especially the midbrain and diencephalon.
- Specialty: Emergency medicine, neurology
- Symptoms: Headache; trouble with thinking, memory, or concentration; nausea; blurry vision; sleep disturbances; mood changes
- Complications: Chronic traumatic encephalopathy, Parkinson's disease, depression, post-concussion syndrome
- Duration: Up to 4 weeks
- Causes: Motor vehicle collisions, falls, sports injuries, bicycle accidents
- Risk factors: Physical violence, drinking alcohol, playing contact sports such as American football, playing martial arts such as muay thai, previous history of concussion
- Diagnostic method: Based on symptoms
- Prevention: Head protection equipment, mouth guards, evidence-informed rules and policies for body checking and contact in sport, seat belts, neuromuscular training exercises
- Treatment: Brief period of relative rest, aerobic exercise to increase heart rate 1-2 days after injury, physiotherapy, gradual return to activities such as school and work
- Medication: Paracetamol (acetaminophen), NSAIDs
- Frequency: 6 per 1,000 people a year

A concussion, also known as a mild traumatic brain injury (mTBI), is a head injury that temporarily affects brain functioning. Symptoms may include headache, dizziness, difficulty with thinking and concentration, sleep disturbances, a brief period of memory loss, brief loss of consciousness, problems with balance, nausea, blurred vision, and mood changes. Concussion should be suspected if a person hits their head and experiences any of the symptoms of concussion. Signs and symptoms of a concussion usually occur within minutes to hours of the injury, usually within 72 hours. However, symptoms may be delayed by 1–2 days after the accident. It is not unusual for symptoms to last 2 weeks in adults and 4 weeks in children. Symptoms of a concussion may make it difficult to return to work, school, sports (in cases of sports related concussions) or prior level of functioning, with disability usually lasting days to weeks. Fewer than 10% of sports-related concussions among children are associated with loss of consciousness.

Common causes include motor vehicle collisions, falls, sports injuries, and bicycle accidents. Risk factors include physical violence, drinking alcohol and a prior history of concussion. The mechanism of injury involves either a direct blow to the head or forces elsewhere on the body that are transmitted to the head. This is believed to result in neuron dysfunction, as there are increased glucose requirements, but not enough blood supply. A thorough evaluation by a qualified medical provider working in their scope of practice (such as a physician or nurse practitioner) is required to rule out life-threatening head injuries, injuries to the cervical spine, and neurological conditions and to use information obtained from the medical evaluation to diagnose a concussion. Glasgow coma scale score 13 to 15, loss of consciousness for less than 30 minutes, and memory loss for less than 24 hours may be used to rule out moderate or severe traumatic brain injuries. Diagnostic imaging such as a CT scan or an MRI may be required to rule out severe head injuries. Routine imaging is not required to diagnose concussion and is, by definition, normal after concussions.

Prevention of concussion approaches includes the use of a helmet and mouth guard for certain sporting activities, seatbelt use in motor vehicles, following rules and policies on body checking and body contact in organized sport, and neuromuscular training warm-up exercises. Treatment of concussion includes relative rest for no more than 1–2 days, aerobic exercise to increase the heart rate and gradual step-wise return to activities, school, and work. Prolonged periods of rest may slow recovery and result in greater depression and anxiety. Paracetamol (acetaminophen) or NSAIDs may be recommended to help with a headache. Prescribed aerobic exercise may improve recovery. Physiotherapy may be useful for persisting balance problems, headache, or whiplash; cognitive behavioral therapy may be useful for mood changes and sleep problems. Evidence to support the use of hyperbaric oxygen therapy and chiropractic therapy is lacking.

Worldwide, concussions are estimated to affect more than 3.5 per 1,000 people a year. Concussions are classified as mild traumatic brain injuries and are the most common type of TBIs. Males and young adults are most commonly affected. Outcomes are generally good. Another concussion before the symptoms of a prior concussion have resolved is associated with worse outcomes. Repeated concussions may also increase the risk in later life of chronic traumatic encephalopathy, Parkinson's disease and depression.

Video explanation of concussions in children

== Signs and symptoms ==
Concussion symptoms vary between people and include physical, cognitive, and emotional symptoms. Signs and symptoms of a concussion usually appear within 72 hours of the injury, most commonly within the first several minutes to hours after the injury. However, symptoms may be delayed by 1–2 days. Delayed onset of symptoms may still be serious and require a medical assessment. Up to one-third of people with concussion experience longer or persisting concussion symptoms, also known as post concussion syndrome or persisting symptoms after concussion, which is defined as concussion symptoms lasting for 4 weeks or longer in children and adolescents, and symptoms lasting for more than 14 days in an adult. The severity of the initial symptoms is the strongest predictor of recovery time in adults.

=== Physical ===
Headaches are the most common mTBI symptom. Others include dizziness, vomiting, nausea, lack of motor coordination, difficulty balancing, or other problems with movement or sensation. Visual symptoms include light sensitivity, seeing bright lights, blurred vision, and double vision. Tinnitus, or a ringing in the ears, is also commonly reported. In one in about seventy concussions, concussive convulsions occur, but seizures that take place during or immediately after a concussion are not "post-traumatic seizures", and, unlike post-traumatic seizures, are not predictive of post-traumatic epilepsy, which requires some form of structural brain damage, not just a momentary disruption in normal brain functioning. Concussive convulsions are thought to result from temporary loss or inhibition of motor function and are not associated either with epilepsy or with more serious structural damage. They are not associated with any particular sequelae and have the same high rate of favorable outcomes as concussions without convulsions.

=== Cognitive and emotional ===
Cognitive symptoms include confusion, disorientation, and difficulty focusing attention. Loss of consciousness may occur, but is not necessarily correlated with the severity of the concussion if it is brief. Post-traumatic amnesia, in which events following the injury cannot be recalled, is a hallmark of concussions. Confusion may be present immediately or may develop over several minutes. A person may repeat the same questions, be slow to respond to questions or directions, have a vacant stare, or have slurred or incoherent speech. Other concussion symptoms include changes in sleeping patterns and difficulty with reasoning, concentrating, and performing everyday activities.

A concussion can result in changes in mood including crankiness, loss of interest in favorite activities or items, tearfulness, and displays of emotion that are inappropriate to the situation. Common symptoms in concussed children include restlessness, lethargy, and irritability.

== Mechanism ==
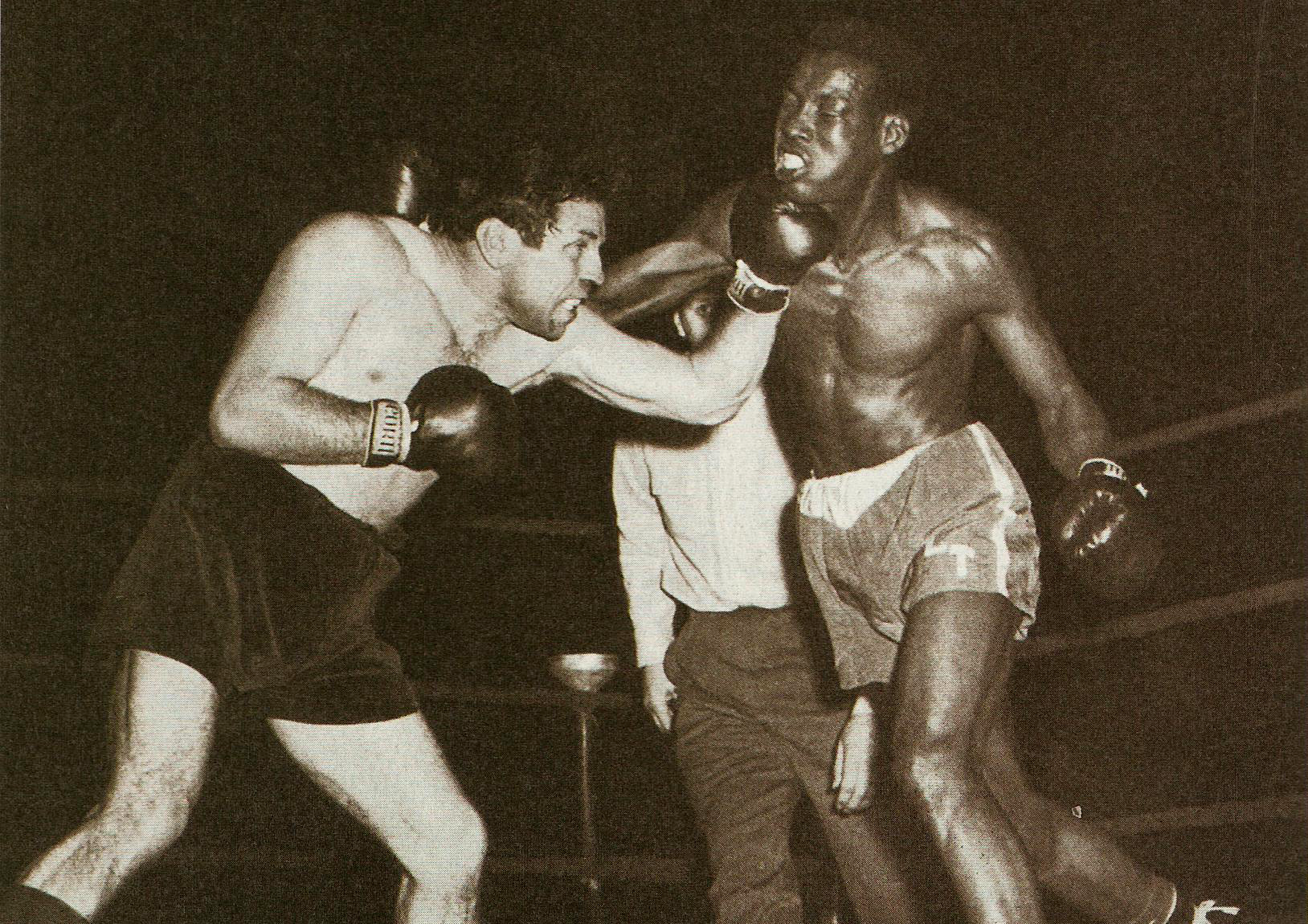
Rotational force is key in a concussion. Punches in boxing can deliver more rotational force to the head than the typical impact in American football.

=== Forces ===
The brain is surrounded by cerebrospinal fluid, which protects it from light trauma. More severe impacts, or the forces associated with rapid acceleration, may not be absorbed by this cushion. Concussions, and other head-related injuries, occur when external forces acting on the head are transferred to the brain. Such forces can occur when the head is struck by an object or surface (a 'direct impact'), or when the torso rapidly changes position (i.e. from a body check) and force is transmitted to the head (an 'indirect impact').

Forces may cause linear, rotational, or angular movement of the brain or a combination of them. In rotational movement, the head turns around its center of gravity, and in angular movement, it turns on an axis, not through its center of gravity. The amount of rotational force is thought to be the major component in concussion and its severity. As of 2007, studies with athletes have shown that the amount of force and the location of the impact are not necessarily correlated with the severity of the concussion or its symptoms, and have called into question the threshold for concussion previously thought to exist at around 70–75 g.

The parts of the brain most affected by rotational forces are the midbrain and diencephalon. It is thought that the forces from the injury disrupt the normal cellular activities in the reticular activating system located in these areas and that this disruption produces the loss of consciousness often seen in concussion. Other areas of the brain that may be affected include the upper part of the brain stem, the fornix, the corpus callosum, the temporal lobe, and the frontal lobe. Angular accelerations of 4600, 5900, or 7900 rad/s^{2} are estimated to have 25, 50, or 80% risk of mTBI respectively.

=== Pathophysiology ===
In both animals and humans, mTBI can alter the brain's physiology for hours to years, setting into motion a variety of pathological events. As one example, in animal models, after an initial increase in glucose metabolism, there is a subsequent reduced metabolic state which may persist for up to four weeks after injury. Though these events are thought to interfere with neuronal and brain function, the metabolic processes that follow concussion are reversible in a large majority of affected brain cells; however, a few cells may die after the injury.

Included in the cascade of events unleashed in the brain by concussion is impaired neurotransmission, loss of regulation of ions, deregulation of energy use and cellular metabolism, and a reduction in cerebral blood flow. Excitatory neurotransmitters, chemicals such as glutamate that serve to stimulate nerve cells, are released in excessive amounts. The resulting cellular excitation causes neurons to fire excessively. This creates an imbalance of ions such as potassium and calcium across the cell membranes of neurons (a process like excitotoxicity).

At the same time, cerebral blood flow is relatively reduced for unknown reasons, though the reduction in blood flow is not as severe as it is in ischemia. Thus cells get less glucose than they normally do, which causes an "energy crisis".

Concurrently with these processes, the activity of mitochondria may be reduced, which causes cells to rely on anaerobic metabolism to produce energy, increasing levels of the byproduct lactate.

For a period of minutes to days after a concussion, the brain is especially vulnerable to changes in intracranial pressure, blood flow, and anoxia. According to studies performed on animals (which are not always applicable to humans), large numbers of neurons can die during this period in response to slight, normally innocuous changes in blood flow.

Concussion involves diffuse (as opposed to focal) brain injury, meaning that the dysfunction occurs over a widespread area of the brain rather than in a particular spot. It is thought to be a milder type of diffuse axonal injury, because axons may be injured to a minor extent due to stretching. Animal studies in which rodents were concussed have revealed lifelong neuropathological consequences such as ongoing axonal degeneration and neuroinflammation in subcortical white matter tracts. Axonal damage has been found in the brains of concussion patients who died from other causes, but inadequate blood flow to the brain due to other injuries may have contributed. Findings from a study of the brains of deceased NFL athletes who received concussions suggest that lasting damage is done by such injuries. This damage, the severity of which increases with the cumulative number of concussions sustained, can lead to a variety of other health issues.

The debate over whether concussion is a functional or structural phenomenon is ongoing. Structural damage has been found in the mildly traumatically injured brains of animals, but it is not clear whether these findings would apply to humans. Such changes in brain structure could be responsible for certain symptoms such as visual disturbances, but other sets of symptoms, especially those of a psychological nature, are more likely to be caused by reversible pathophysiological changes in cellular function that occur after concussion, such as alterations in neurons' biochemistry. These reversible changes could also explain why dysfunction is frequently temporary. A task force of head injury experts called the Concussion In Sport Group met in 2001 and decided that "concussion may result in neuropathological changes but the acute clinical symptoms largely reflect a functional disturbance rather than structural injury."

Using animal studies, the pathology of a concussion seems to start with mechanical shearing and stretching forces disrupting the cell membrane of nerve cells through "mechanoporation". This results in potassium outflow from within the cell into the extracellular space with the subsequent release of excitatory neurotransmitters including glutamate which leads to enhanced potassium extrusion, in turn resulting in sustained depolarization, impaired nerve activity and potential nerve damage. Human studies have failed to identify changes in glutamate concentration immediately post-mTBI, though disruptions have been seen 3 days to 2 weeks post-injury. In an effort to restore ion balance, the sodium-potassium ion pumps increase activity, which results in excessive ATP (adenosine triphosphate) consumption and glucose utilization, quickly depleting glucose stores within the cells. Simultaneously, inefficient oxidative metabolism leads to anaerobic metabolism of glucose and increased lactate accumulation. There is a resultant local acidosis in the brain and increased cell membrane permeability, leading to local swelling. After this increase in glucose metabolism, there is a subsequent lower metabolic state which may persist for up to 4 weeks after injury. A completely separate pathway involves a large amount of calcium accumulating in cells, which may impair oxidative metabolism and begin further biochemical pathways that result in cell death. Again, both of these main pathways have been established from animal studies and the extent to which they apply to humans is still somewhat unclear.

== Diagnosis ==
Red flags are warning signs that may indicate a more serious problem and require immediate emergency medical attention
Red flag symptoms (emergent assessment required)
Seizure or convulsions
Worsening headache
Difficulty waking up (or loss of consciousness)
Seeing double
Problems recognizing people or places or confusion
Repeated vomiting
Numbness, weakness in extremities, or slurred speech
Not usual self, aggressive, or agitated behaviour
Neck pain or tenderness in the neck

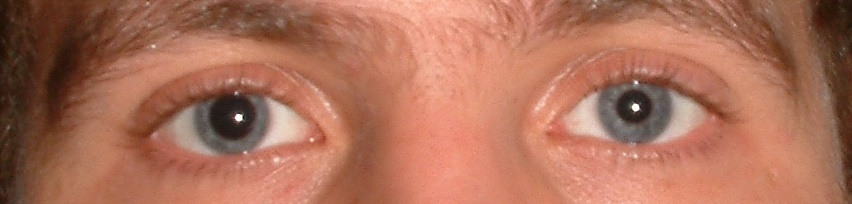
Unequal pupil size is not a sign of concussion and can be a sign of a more serious brain injury.

Head trauma recipients are initially assessed to exclude a more severe emergency such as an intracranial hemorrhage or other serious head or neck injuries. This includes the "ABCs" (airway, breathing, circulation) and stabilization of the cervical spine, which is assumed to be injured in any athlete who is found to be unconscious after head or neck injury. Indications that screening for more serious injury is needed include 'red flag symptoms' or 'concussion danger signs': worsening headaches, persisting vomiting, increasing disorientation or a deteriorating level of consciousness, seizures, and unequal pupil size. Those with such symptoms, or those who are at higher risk of a more serious brain injury, require an emergency medical assessment. Brain imaging such as a CT scan or MRI may be suggested, but should be avoided unless there are progressive neurological symptoms, focal neurological findings, or concern of skull fracture on exam.

Diagnosis of concussion requires an assessment performed by a physician or nurse practitioner to rule out severe injuries to the brain and cervical spine, mental health conditions, or other medical conditions. Diagnosis is based on physical and neurological examination findings, duration of unconsciousness (usually less than 30 minutes) and post-traumatic amnesia (usually less than 24 hours), and the Glasgow Coma Scale (people with mTBI have scores of 13 to 15). A CT scan or MRI is not required to diagnose concussion. Neuropsychological tests such as the SCAT5/child SCAT5 may be suggested measure cognitive function. Such tests may be administered hours, days, or weeks after the injury, or at different times to demonstrate any trend. Some athletes are also being tested pre-season (pre-season baseline testing) to provide a baseline for comparison in the event of an injury, though this may not reduce risk or affect return to play and baseline testing is not required or suggested for most children and adults.

In cases where the diagnosis of concussion is unclear, exercise stress testing may be done. These types of tests (such as the Buffalo concussion exercise test) involve exercising under close supervision, and reproduction of symptoms suggests a concussion. Exercise provocation testing can diagnose concussions with 94% sensitivity and specificity.

If the Glasgow coma scale is less than 15 at two hours or less than 14 at any time, a CT is recommended. In addition, a CT scan is more likely to be performed if observation after discharge is not assured or intoxication is present, there is suspected increased risk for bleeding, age greater than 60, or less than 16. Most concussions, without complication, cannot be detected with MRI or CT scans. However, changes have been reported on MRI and SPECT imaging in those with concussion and normal CT scans, and persisting concussion symptoms may be associated with abnormalities visible on SPECT and PET scans. Mild head injury may or may not produce abnormal EEG readings. A blood test known as the Brain Trauma Indicator was approved in the United States in 2018 and may be able to rule out the risk of intracranial bleeding and thus the need for a CT scan for adults.

Concussion may be under-diagnosed because of the lack of the highly noticeable signs and symptoms while athletes may minimize their injuries to remain in the competition. Direct impact to the head is not required for a concussion diagnosis, as other bodily impacts with a subsequent force transmission to the head are also causes. A retrospective survey in 2005 suggested that more than 88% of concussions are unrecognized. Particularly, many younger athletes struggle with identifying their concussions, which often result in the non-disclosure of concussions and consequently under-representing the incidence of concussions in the context of sport.

Diagnosis can be complex because concussion shares symptoms with other conditions. For example, persisting concussion symptoms such as cognitive problems may be misattributed to brain injury when, in fact, due to post-traumatic stress disorder (PTSD).

There are no fluid biomarkers (i.e., blood or urine tests) that are validated for diagnosing concussion in children or adolescents.

=== Classification ===
No single definition of concussion, minor head injury, or mild traumatic brain injury is universally accepted. In 2001, the expert Concussion in Sport Group of the first International Symposium on Concussion in Sport defined concussion as "a complex pathophysiological process affecting the brain, induced by traumatic biomechanical forces." It was agreed that concussion typically involves temporary impairment of neurological function that heals by itself within time, and that neuroimaging normally shows no gross structural changes to the brain as the result of the condition.

However, although no structural brain damage occurs according to the classic definition, some researchers have included injuries in which structural damage has occurred, and the National Institute for Health and Clinical Excellence definition includes physiological or physical disruption in the brain's synapses. Also, by definition, concussion has historically involved a loss of consciousness. However, the definition has evolved over time to include a change in consciousness, such as amnesia, although controversy continues about whether the definition should include only those injuries in which loss of consciousness occurs. This debate resurfaces in some of the best-known concussion grading scales, in which those episodes involving loss of consciousness are graded as being more severe than those without.

Definitions of mild traumatic brain injury (mTBI) were inconsistent until the World Health Organization's International Statistical Classification of Diseases and Related Health Problems (ICD-10) provided a consistent, authoritative definition across specialties in 1992. Since then, various organizations such as the American Congress of Rehabilitation Medicine and the American Psychiatric Association in its Diagnostic and Statistical Manual of Mental Disorders have defined mTBI using some combination of loss of consciousness, post-traumatic amnesia, and the Glasgow Coma Scale.

Concussion falls under the classification of mild TBI, but it is not clear whether concussion is implied in mild brain injury or mild head injury. "mTBI" and "concussion" are often treated as synonyms in medical literature but other injuries such as intracranial hemorrhages (e.g. intra-axial hematoma, epidural hematoma, and subdural hematoma) are not necessarily precluded in mTBI or mild head injury, as they are in concussion. mTBI associated with abnormal neuroimaging may be considered "complicated mTBI". "Concussion" can be considered to imply a state in which brain function is temporarily impaired and "mTBI" to imply a pathophysiological state, but in practice, few researchers and clinicians distinguish between the terms. Descriptions of the condition, including the severity and the area of the brain affected, are now used more often than "concussion" in clinical neurology.

== Prevention ==
Prevention of mTBI involves general measures such as wearing seat belts, using airbags in cars, and protective equipment such as helmets for high-risk sports. Older people are encouraged to reduce fall risk by keeping floors free of clutter and wearing thin, flat shoes with hard soles that do not interfere with balance.

Protective equipment such as helmets and other headgear and policy changes such as the banning of body checking in youth hockey leagues have been found to reduce the number and severity of concussions in athletes. Secondary prevention such as a Return to Play Protocol for an athlete may reduce the risk of repeat concussions. New "Head Impact Telemetry System" technology is being placed in helmets to study injury mechanisms and may generate knowledge that will potentially help reduce the risk of concussions among American Football players. Mouth guards have been put forward as a preventative measure, and there is mixed evidence supporting its use in preventing concussions but rather has support in preventing dental trauma.

Educational interventions, such as handouts, videos, workshops, and lectures, can improve concussion knowledge of diverse groups, particularly youth athletes and coaches. Strong concussion knowledge may be associated with greater recognition of concussion symptoms, higher rates of concussion reporting behaviors, and reduced body checking-related penalties and injuries, thereby lowering risk of mTBI.

Younger athletes often do not disclose concussions and their symptoms. Common reasons for non-disclosure include a lack of awareness of the concussion, the belief that the concussion was not serious enough, and not wanting to leave the game or team due to their injury. Changes to the rules or enforcing existing rules in sports, such as those against "head-down tackling", or "spearing", which is associated with a high injury rate, may prevent concussions.

== Treatment ==
Adults and children with a suspected concussion require a medical assessment with a doctor or nurse practitioner to confirm the diagnosis of concussion and rule out more serious head injuries. After life-threatening head injuries, injuries to the cervical spine, and neurological conditions are ruled out, observation should be continued for several hours. If repeated vomiting, worsening headache, dizziness, seizures, excessive drowsiness, double vision, slurred speech, unsteady walk, or weakness or numbness in arms or legs, or signs of basilar skull fracture develop, immediate assessment in an emergency department is needed. Observation to monitor for worsening condition is an important part of treatment. While it is common advice that someone who is concussed should not be allowed to fall asleep in case they go into a coma, for general cases this is not supported by current evidence. People may be released after assessment from their primary care medical clinic, hospital, or emergency room to the care of a trusted person with instructions to return if they display worsening symptoms or those that might indicate an emergent condition ("red flag symptoms") such as change in consciousness, convulsions, severe headache, extremity weakness, vomiting, new bleeding or deafness in either or both ears. Education about symptoms, their management, and their normal time course, may lead to an improved outcome.

=== Rest and return to physical and cognitive activity ===
Physical and cognitive rest is recommended for the first 24–48 hours following a concussion after which injured people should gradually start gentle low-risk physical and cognitive activities that do not make current symptoms worse or bring on new symptoms. Any activity for which there is a risk of contact, falling, or bumping the head should be avoided until the person has clearance from a doctor or nurse practitioner. Low-risk activities can be started even while a person has symptoms. Resting completely for longer than 24–48 hours following concussion has been shown to be associated with longer recovery. Therefore, guidelines do not recommend strict physical and cognitive rest until symptoms are resolved. Starting light activities early, such as walking or doing some activities of daily living (such as cooking or light cleaning) are associated with faster recovery times compared to strict rest.

Excessive screen time within 48 hours of the injury may delay the recovery, based on results of a small trial.

=== Return-to-school ===
The resumption of low-risk school activities should begin as soon as the student feels ready and has completed an initial period of cognitive rest of no more than 24–48 hours following the acute injury. Long absences from school are not suggested, however; the return to school should be gradual and step-wise. Prolonged complete mental or physical rest (beyond 24–48 hours after the accident that lead to the concussion) may worsen outcomes, however, rushing back to full school work load before the person is ready, has also been associated with longer-lasting symptoms and an extended recovery time. Students with a suspected concussion are required to see a doctor for an initial medical assessment and for suggestions on recovery, however, medical clearance is not required for a student to return to school. Since students may appear 'normal', continuing education of relevant school personnel may be needed to ensure appropriate accommodations are made such as part-days and extended deadlines. Accommodations should be based on the monitoring of symptoms that are present during the return-to-school transition including headaches, dizziness, vision problems, memory loss, difficulty concentrating, and abnormal behavior. Students must have completely resumed their school activities (without requiring concussion-related academic supports) before returning to full-contact or competitive sports.

=== Return-to-sport ===
For people participating in athletics, it is suggested that participants progress through a series of graded steps. These steps include:

- Stage 1 (Immediately after injury): 24–48 hours (maximum) of relative physical and cognitive rest. This can include gentle daily activities such as walking in the house, gentle housework, and light school work that do not make symptoms worse. No sports activities.
- Stage 2: Light aerobic activity such as walking or stationary cycling
- Stage 3: Sport-specific activities such as running drills and skating drills
- Stage 4: Non-contact training drills (exercise, coordination, and cognitive load)
- Stage 5: Full-contact practice (requires medical clearance)
- Stage 6: Return to full-contact sport or high-risk activities (requires medical clearance)

At each step, the person should not have worsening or new symptoms for at least 24 hours before progressing to the next. If symptoms worsen or new symptoms begin, athletes should drop back to the previous level for at least another 24 hours.

Aerobic exercise introduced early and upgraded gradually based on a person's tolerance to activity is associated with faster recoveries from sports related concussions and a lower risk of persistent symptoms (lasting longer than 28 days).

Returning to full participation sports activities without a complete resolution of concussion symptoms and then suffering another concussion is associated with worsening symptoms and prolonged recovery times.

In those with symptoms lasting longer than 10 days, a systematic review showed vestibular rehabilitation or physical therapy focused on the cervical spine facilitated quicker return to sport.

=== Medications ===
Medications may be prescribed to treat headaches, sleep problems and depression. Analgesics such as ibuprofen can be taken for headaches, but paracetamol (acetaminophen) is preferred to minimize the risk of intracranial hemorrhage. Concussed individuals are advised not to use alcohol or other drugs that have not been approved by a doctor as they can impede healing. Activation database-guided EEG biofeedback has been shown to return the memory abilities of the concussed individual to levels better than the control group.

=== Return to work ===
Determining the ideal time for a person to return to work will depend on personal factors and job-related factors including the intensity of the job and the risk of falling or hitting one's head at work during recovery. After the required initial recovery period of complete rest (24–48 hours after the concussion began), gradually and safely returning to the workplace with accommodations and support in place, should be prioritized over staying home and resting for long periods of time, to promote physical recovery and reduce the risk of people becoming socially isolated. The person should work with their employer to design a step-wise "return-to-work" plan. For those with a high-risk job, medical clearance may be required before resuming an activity that could lead to another head injury. Students should have completed the full return-to-school progression with no academic accommodations related to the concussion required before starting to return to part-time work.

== Prognosis ==
The majority of children and adults fully recover from a concussion, however some may experience a prolonged recovery. There is no single physical test, blood test (or fluid biomarkers), or imaging test that can be used to determine when a person has fully recovered from concussion. However, the severity of symptoms in the first days after an injury and concussion are a strong predictor of persistent symptoms. Injury to the neck is also a predictor of prolonged symptoms, and may also contribute to symptoms such as headache (cervicogenic headache) or dizziness.

A person's recovery may be influenced by a variety of factors that include age at the time of injury, intellectual abilities, family environment, social support system, occupational status, coping strategies, and financial circumstances. Factors such as a previous head injury or a coexisting medical condition have been found to predict longer-lasting persisting concussion symptoms. Other factors that may lengthen recovery time after mTBI include psychological problems such as substance abuse or clinical depression, poor health before the injury or additional injuries sustained during it, and life stress. Longer periods of amnesia or loss of consciousness immediately after the injury may indicate longer recovery times from residual symptoms. Other strong factors include participation in a contact sport and body mass size.

=== Pediatric concussion ===
Most children recover completely from concussion in less than four weeks, however 15–30% of youth may experience symptoms that last longer than a month.

=== Repeat concussion ===
For unknown reasons, having had one concussion significantly increases a person's risk of having another. Having previously sustained a sports concussion has been found to be a strong factor increasing the likelihood of a concussion in the future. People who have had a concussion seem more susceptible to another one, particularly if the new injury occurs before symptoms from the previous concussion have completely gone away.

=== Post-concussion syndrome ===
In post-concussion syndrome, symptoms do not resolve for weeks, months, or years after a concussion, and may occasionally be permanent. About 10% to 20% of people have persisting concussion symptoms for more than a month. Symptoms may include headaches, dizziness, fatigue, anxiety, memory and attention problems, sleep problems, and irritability. Rest, a previously recommended recovery technique, has limited effectiveness. A recommended treatment in both children and adults with symptoms beyond 4 weeks involves an active rehabilitation program with reintroduction of non-contact aerobic activity. Progressive physical exercise has been shown to reduce long-term post-concussive symptoms. Symptoms usually go away on their own within months but may last for years. The question of whether the syndrome is due to structural damage or other factors such as psychological ones, or a combination of these, has long been the subject of debate.

=== Cumulative effects ===
As of 1999, cumulative effects of concussions were poorly understood, especially the effects on children. The severity of concussions and their symptoms may worsen with successive injuries, even if a subsequent injury occurs months or years after an initial one. Symptoms may be more severe and changes in neurophysiology can occur with the third and subsequent concussions. As of 2006, studies had conflicting findings on whether athletes have longer recovery times after repeat concussions and whether cumulative effects such as impairment in cognition and memory occur.

Cumulative effects may include chronic traumatic encephalopathy, psychiatric disorders and loss of long-term memory. For example, the risk of developing clinical depression has been found to be significantly greater for retired American football players with a history of three or more concussions than for those with no concussion history. An experience of three or more concussions is associated with a fivefold greater chance of developing Alzheimer's disease earlier and a threefold greater chance of developing memory deficits.

Chronic traumatic encephalopathy, or "CTE", is an example of the cumulative damage that can occur as the result of multiple concussions or less severe blows to the head. The condition was previously referred to as "dementia pugilistica", or "punch drunk" syndrome, as it was first noted in boxers. The disease can lead to cognitive and physical disabilities such as parkinsonism, speech and memory problems, slowed mental processing, tremor, depression, and inappropriate behavior. It shares features with Alzheimer's disease.

=== Second-impact syndrome ===
Second-impact syndrome, in which the brain swells dangerously after a minor blow, may occur in very rare cases. The condition may develop in people who receive a second blow days or weeks after an initial concussion before its symptoms have gone away. No one is certain of the cause of this often fatal complication, but it is commonly thought that the swelling occurs because the brain's arterioles lose the ability to regulate their diameter, causing a loss of control over cerebral blood flow. As the brain swells, intracranial pressure rapidly rises. The brain can herniate, and the brain stem can fail within five minutes. Except in boxing, all cases have occurred in athletes under age 20. Due to the very small number of documented cases, the diagnosis is controversial, and doubt exists about its validity. A 2010 Pediatrics review article stated that there is debate whether the brain swelling is due to two separate hits or to just one hit, but in either case, catastrophic football head injuries are three times more likely in high school athletes than in college athletes.

== Epidemiology ==
Annual incidence of MTBI by age group in Canada

Most cases of traumatic brain injury are concussions. A World Health Organization (WHO) study estimated that between 70 and 90% of head injuries that receive treatment are mild. However, due to under reporting and to the widely varying definitions of concussion and mTBI, it is difficult to estimate how common the condition is. Estimates of the incidence of concussion may be artificially low, for example, due to under reporting. At least 25% of people with mTBI fail to get assessed by a medical professional. The WHO group reviewed studies on the epidemiology of mTBI and found a hospital treatment rate of 1–3 per 1000 people, but since not all concussions are treated in hospitals, they estimated that the rate per year in the general population is over 6 per 1000 people.

=== Age ===
Young children have the highest concussion rate among all age groups. However, most people with a concussion are young adults. A Canadian study found that the yearly incidence of mTBI is lower in older age groups (graph at right). Studies suggest males develop mTBI at about twice the rate of their female counterparts. However, female athletes may be at a higher risk of sustaining a concussion than their male counterparts.

=== Sports ===
Up to five percent of sports injuries are concussions. The U.S. Centers for Disease Control and Prevention estimates that 300,000 sports-related concussions occur yearly in the U.S., but that number includes only athletes who lost consciousness. Since loss of consciousness is thought to occur in less than 10% of concussions, the CDC estimate is likely lower than the real number. Sports in which concussion is particularly common include American football, the rugby codes, MMA and boxing (a boxer aims to "knock out", i.e. give a mild traumatic brain injury to, the opponent). The injury is so common in the latter that several medical groups have called for a ban on the sport, including the American Academy of Neurology, the World Medical Association, and the medical associations of the UK, the US, Australia, and Canada.

=== Workplace ===
Concussions may also be common and occur in the workplace. According to the US Bureau of Labour Statistics, the most common causes of mTBI-related hospitalizations and deaths from the workplace are falls, force of heavy objects, and vehicular collisions. As a consequence, jobs in the construction, transportation, and natural resource industries (e.g. agriculture, fishing, mining) have more elevated mTBI incidence rates ranging from 10 to 20 cases per 100,000 workers. In particular, as vehicular collisions are the leading cause of workplace mTBI-related injuries, workers from the transportation sector often carry the most risk. Despite these findings, there still remain important gaps in data compilation on workplace-related mTBIs, which has raised questions about increased concussion surveillance and preventive measures in private industry.

== History ==
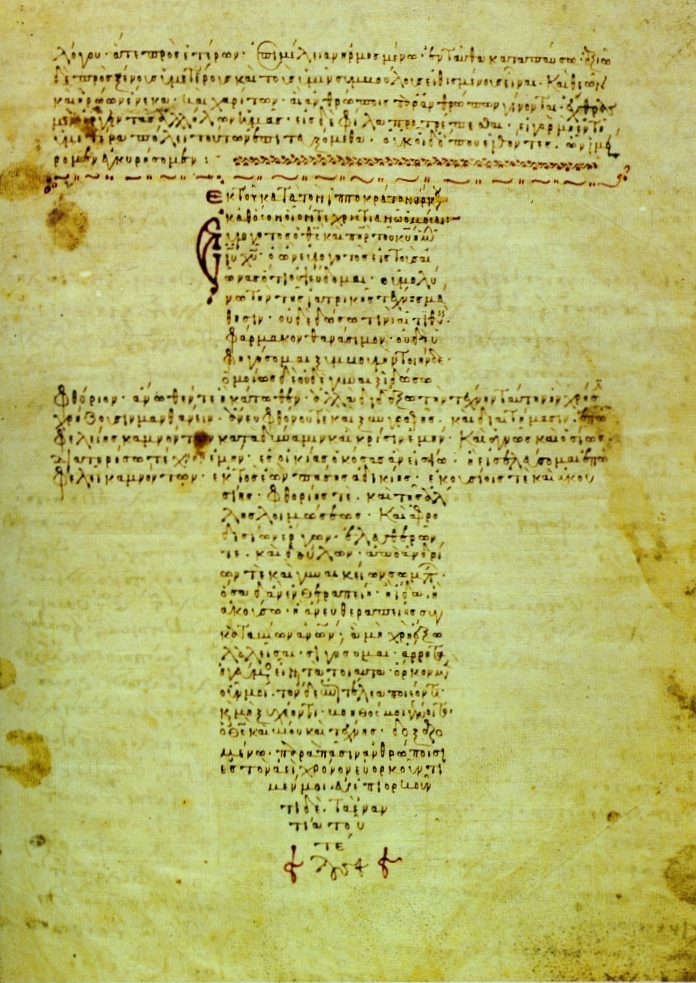
The Hippocratic Corpus mentioned concussion.

The Hippocratic Corpus, a collection of medical works from ancient Greece, mentions concussion, later translated to commotio cerebri, and discusses loss of speech, hearing, and sight that can result from "commotion of the brain". This idea of disruption of mental function by "shaking of the brain" remained the widely accepted understanding of concussion until the 19th century. In the 10th century, the Persian physician Muhammad ibn Zakarīya Rāzi was the first to write about concussion as distinct from other types of head injury. He may have been the first to use the term "cerebral concussion", and his definition of the condition, a transient loss of function with no physical damage, set the stage for the medical understanding of the condition for centuries.

In the 13th century, the physician Lanfranc of Milan's Chiurgia Magna described concussion as brain "commotion", also recognizing a difference between concussion and other types of traumatic brain injury (though many of his contemporaries did not), and discussing the transience of post-concussion symptoms as a result of temporary loss of function from the injury. In the 14th century, the surgeon Guy de Chauliac pointed out the relatively good prognosis of concussion as compared to more severe types of head trauma such as skull fractures and penetrating head trauma. In the 16th-century, the term "concussion" came into use, and symptoms such as confusion, lethargy, and memory problems were described. The 16th century physician Ambroise Paré used the term commotio cerebri, as well as "shaking of the brain", "commotion", and "concussion".

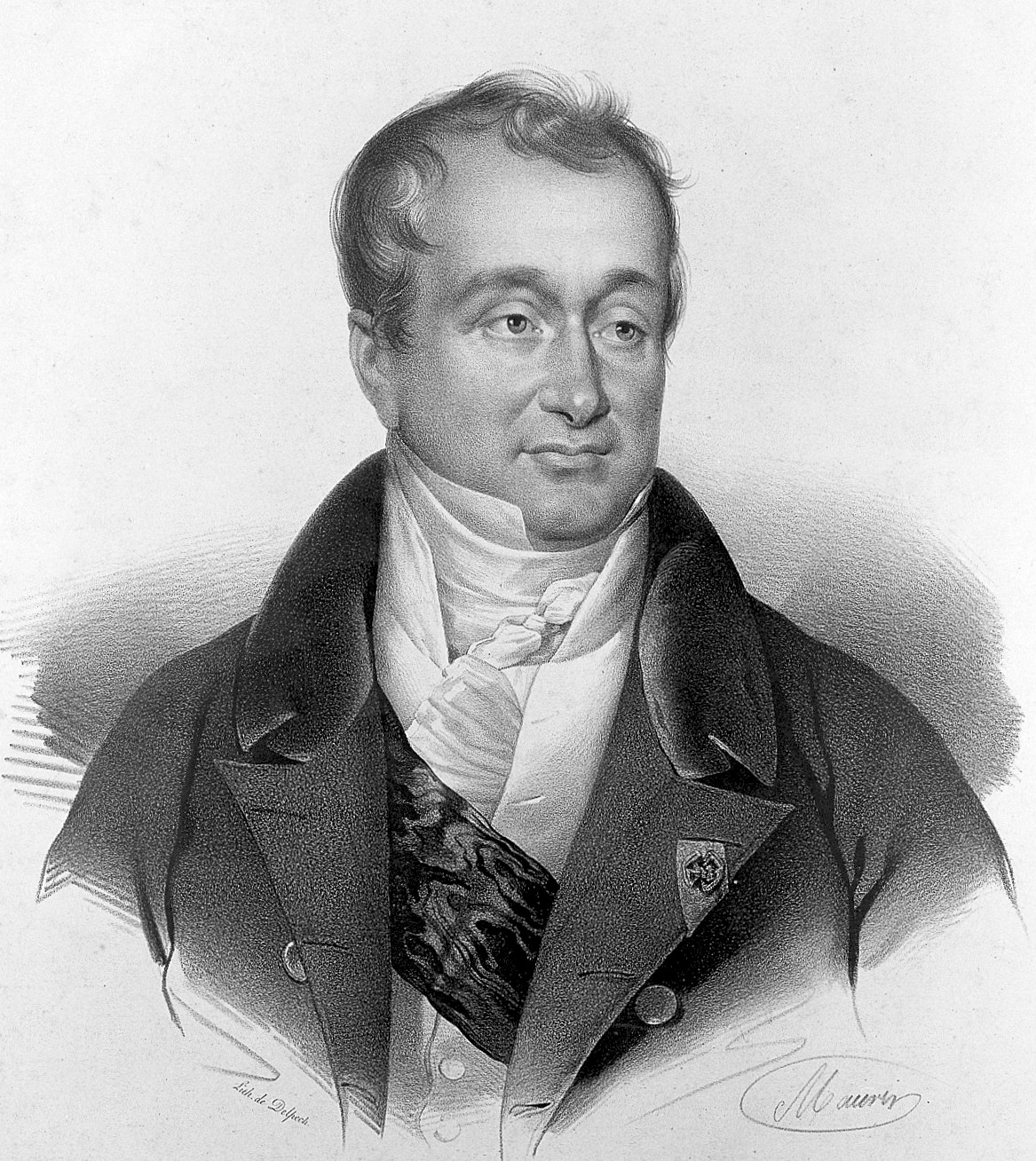
Guillaume Dupuytren distinguished between concussion and unconsciousness associated with brain contusion.

Until the 17th century, a concussion was usually described by its clinical features, but after the invention of the microscope, more physicians began exploring underlying physical and structural mechanisms. However, the prevailing view in the 17th century was that the injury did not result from physical damage, and this view continued to be widely held throughout the 18th century. The word "concussion" was used at the time to describe the state of unconsciousness and other functional problems that resulted from the impact, rather than a physiological condition. In 1839, Guillaume Dupuytren described brain contusions, which involve many small hemorrhages, as contusio cerebri and showed the difference between unconsciousness associated with damage to the brain parenchyma and that due to concussion, without such injury. In 1941, animal experiments showed that no macroscopic damage occurs in concussion.

== Society and culture ==
=== Costs ===
Due to the lack of a consistent definition, the economic costs of mTBI are not known, but they are estimated to be very high. These high costs are due in part to the large percentage of hospital admissions for head injury that is due to mild head trauma, but indirect costs such as lost work time and early retirement account for the bulk of the costs. These direct and indirect costs cause the expense of mild brain trauma to rival that of moderate and severe head injuries.

=== Terminology ===
The terms mild brain injury, mild traumatic brain injury (mTBI), mild head injury (MHI), and concussion may be used interchangeably; although the term "concussion" is still used in sports literature as interchangeable with "MHI" or "mTBI", the general clinical medical literature uses "mTBI" instead, since a 2003 CDC report outlined it as an important strategy. In this article, "concussion" and "mTBI" are used interchangeably.

The term "concussion" is from Latin concutere, "to shake violently" or concussus, "action of striking together".

== Research ==
Minocycline, lithium, and N-acetylcysteine show tentative success in animal models.

Measurement of predictive visual tracking is being studied as a screening technique to identify mild traumatic brain injury. A head-mounted display unit with eye-tracking capability shows a moving object in a predictive pattern for the person to follow with their eyes. People without brain injury will be able to track the moving object with smooth pursuit eye movements and correct trajectory while it is hypothesized that those with mild traumatic brain injury cannot.

=== Grading systems ===
National and international clinical practice guidelines do not recommend a concussion grading system for use by medical professionals.

==== Historical information on grading systems ====
In the past, the decision to allow athletes to return to participation was frequently based on the grade of concussion. However, current research and recommendations by professional organizations including the National Athletic Trainers' Association recommend against such use of these grading systems. Currently, injured athletes are prohibited from returning to play before they are symptom-free during both rest and exertion and until results of the neuropsychological tests have returned to pre-injury levels. Three grading systems have been most widely followed: by Robert Cantu, the Colorado Medical Society, and the American Academy of Neurology. Each employs three grades, as summarized in the following table:

Comparison of historic concussion grading scales – not currently recommended for use by medical professionals
Guidelines	Grade I	Grade II	Grade III
Cantu	Post-traumatic amnesia <30 minutes, no loss of consciousness	Loss of consciousness <5 minutes or amnesia lasting 30 minutes–24 hours	Loss of consciousness >5 minutes or amnesia >24 hours
Colorado Medical Society	Confusion, no loss of consciousness	Confusion, post-traumatic amnesia, no loss of consciousness	Any loss of consciousness
American Academy of Neurology	Confusion, symptoms last <15 minutes, no loss of consciousness	Symptoms last >15 minutes, no loss of consciousness	Loss of consciousness (IIIa, coma lasts seconds, IIIb for minutes)

At least 41 systems measure the severity, or grade, of a mild head injury, and there is little agreement about which is best. In an effort to simplify, the 2nd International Conference on Concussion in Sport, meeting in Prague in 2004, decided that these systems should be abandoned in favor of a 'simple' or 'complex' classification. However, the 2008 meeting in Zurich abandoned the simple versus complex terminology, although the participants did agree to keep the concept that most (80–90%) concussions resolve in a short period (7–10 days) and although the recovery time frame may be longer in children and adolescents.

== See also ==
- Concussions in American football
- Concussions in rugby union
- Coup and contrecoup injury
- Head injury criterion
- Helmet removal (sports)
