= Head injury =

Serious trauma to the cranium

- Other names: Head trauma
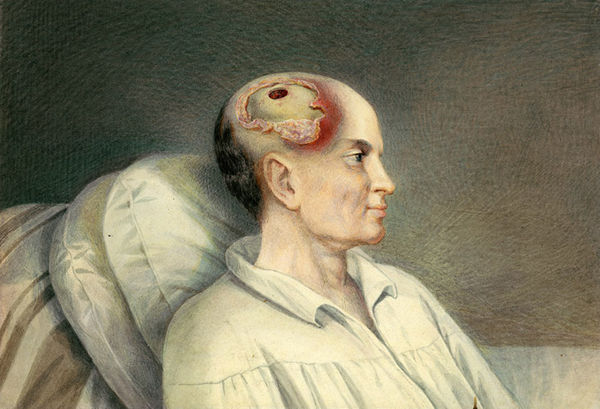
- Soldier wounded at the Battle of Antietam on September 17, 1862.
- Specialty: Neurosurgery, Psychiatry, Neurology, Emergency Medicine
- Symptoms: Injury to the brain or skull
- Complications: Hydrocephalus, cerebral edema, cerebral hemorrhage, stroke, coma, nervous system damage, paralysis, death
- Types: Concussion, cerebral contusion, penetrating head injury, basilar skull fracture, traumatic brain injury

A head injury is any injury that results in trauma to the skull or brain. The terms traumatic brain injury and head injury are often used interchangeably in the medical literature. Because head injuries cover such a broad scope of injuries, there are many causes—including accidents, falls, physical assault, or traffic accidents—that can cause head injuries.

The number of new cases is 1.7 million in the United States each year, with about 3% of these incidents leading to death. Adults have head injuries more frequently than any age group resulting from falls, motor vehicle crashes, colliding or being struck by an object, or assaults. Children, however, may experience head injuries from accidental falls or intentional causes (such as being struck or shaken) leading to hospitalization. Acquired brain injury (ABI) is a term used to differentiate brain injuries occurring after birth from injury, from a genetic disorder, or from a congenital disorder.

Unlike a broken bone where trauma to the body is obvious, head trauma can sometimes be conspicuous or inconspicuous. In the case of an open head injury, the skull is cracked and broken by an object that makes contact with the brain. This leads to bleeding. Other obvious symptoms can be neurological in nature. The person may become sleepy, behave abnormally, lose consciousness, vomit, develop a severe headache, have mismatched pupil sizes, and/or be unable to move certain parts of the body. While these symptoms happen immediately after a head injury occurs, many problems can develop later in life. Alzheimer's disease, for example, is much more likely to develop in a person who has experienced a head injury.

Brain damage, which is the destruction or degeneration of brain cells, is a common occurrence in those who experience a head injury. Neurotoxicity is another cause of brain damage that typically refers to selective, chemically induced neuron/brain damage.

== Classification ==
Head injuries include both injuries to the brain and those to other parts of the head, such as the scalp and skull. Head injuries can be closed or open. A closed (non-missile) head injury is where the dura mater remains intact. The skull can be fractured, but not necessarily. A penetrating head injury occurs when an object pierces the skull and breaches the dura mater. Brain injuries may be diffuse, occurring over a wide area, or focal, located in a small, specific area. A head injury may cause skull fracture, which may or may not be associated with injury to the brain. Some patients may have linear or depressed skull fractures. If intracranial hemorrhage occurs, a hematoma within the skull can put pressure on the brain. Types of intracranial hemorrhage include subdural, subarachnoid, extradural, and intraparenchymal hematoma. Craniotomy surgeries are used in these cases to lessen the pressure by draining off the blood.

Brain injury can occur at the site of impact, but can also be at the opposite side of the skull due to a contrecoup effect (the impact to the head can cause the brain to move within the skull, causing the brain to impact the interior of the skull opposite the head-impact). While impact on the brain at the same site of injury to the skull is the coup effect. If the impact causes the head to move, the injury may be worsened, because the brain may ricochet inside the skull causing additional impacts, or the brain may stay relatively still (due to inertia) but be hit by the moving skull (both are contrecoup injuries).

Specific problems after head injury can include

- Skull fracture
- Lacerations to the scalp and resulting hemorrhage of the skin
- Traumatic subdural hematoma, a bleeding below the dura mater which may develop slowly
- Traumatic extradural, or epidural hematoma, bleeding between the dura mater and the skull
- Traumatic subarachnoid hemorrhage
- Cerebral contusion, a bruise of the brain
- Concussion, a loss of function due to trauma
- Dementia pugilistica, or "punch-drunk syndrome", caused by repetitive head injuries, for example in boxing or other contact sports
- A severe injury may lead to a coma or death
- Shaken baby syndrome – a form of child abuse

=== Concussion ===
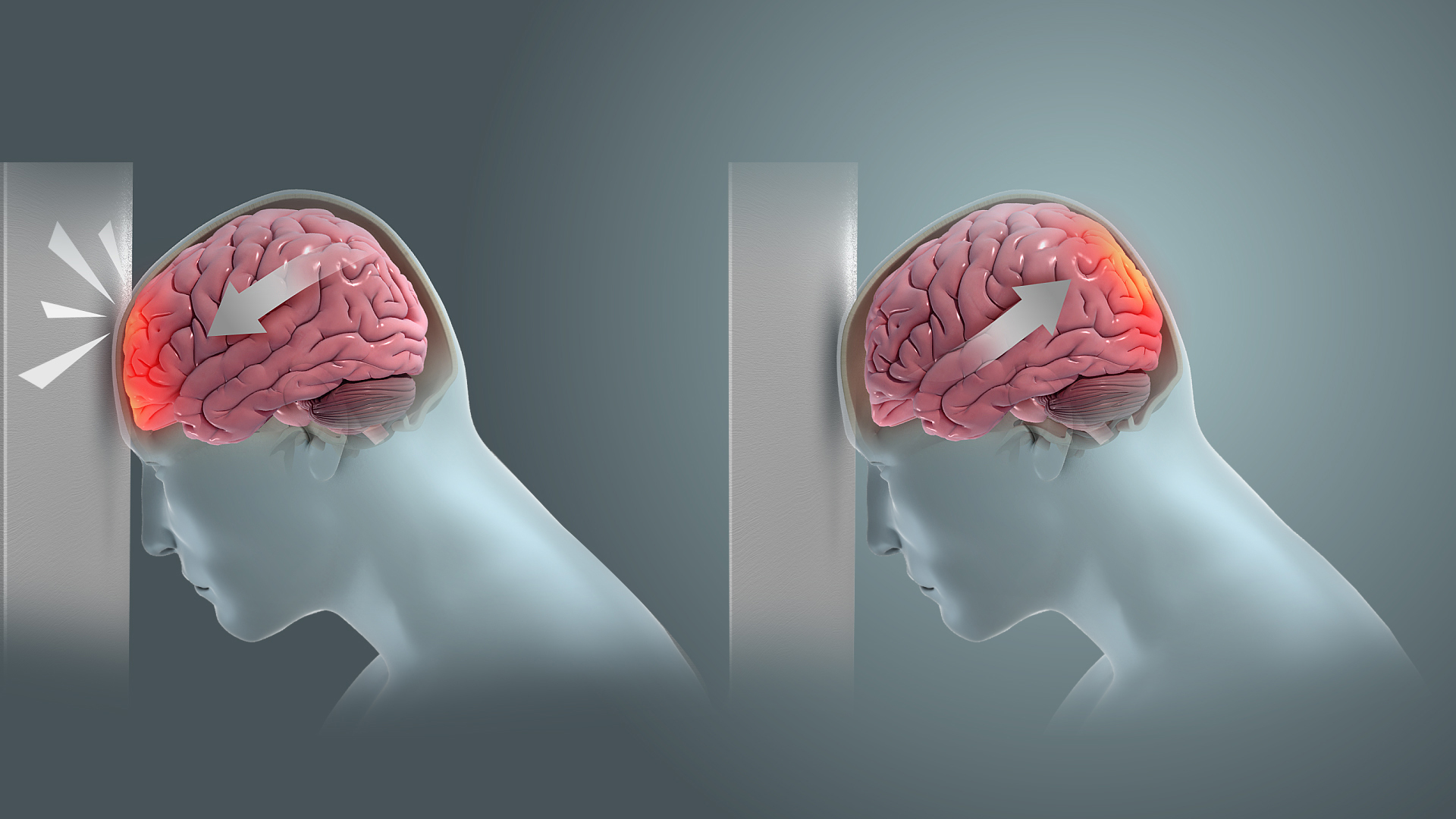
Coup injury

A concussion is a form of a mild traumatic brain injury (TBI). This injury is a result due to a blow to the head that could make the person's physical, cognitive, and emotional behaviors irregular. Symptoms may include clumsiness, fatigue, confusion, nausea, blurry vision, headaches, and others. Mild concussions are associated with sequelae. Severity is measured using various concussion grading systems.

A slightly greater injury is associated with both anterograde and retrograde amnesia (inability to remember events before or after the injury). The amount of time that the amnesia is present correlates with the severity of the injury. In all cases, the patients develop post concussion syndrome, which includes memory problems, dizziness, tiredness, sickness and depression. Cerebral concussion is the most common head injury seen in children.

=== Intracranial bleeding ===
Types of intracranial hemorrhage are roughly grouped into intra-axial and extra-axial. The hemorrhage is considered a focal brain injury; that is, it occurs in a localized spot rather than causing diffuse damage over a wider area.

==== Intra-axial bleeding ====
Intra-axial hemorrhage is bleeding within the brain itself, or cerebral hemorrhage. This category includes intraparenchymal hemorrhage, or bleeding within the brain tissue, and intraventricular hemorrhage, bleeding within the brain's ventricles (particularly of premature infants). Intra-axial hemorrhages are more dangerous and harder to treat than extra-axial bleeds.

==== Extra-axial bleeding ====
Comparison of epidural and subdural hematomas
Compared quality	Epidural	Subdural
Location	Between the skull and the inner meningeal layer of the dura mater or between outer endosteal and inner meningeal layer of dura mater	Between the meningeal layers of dura mater and the Arachnoid mater
Involved vessel	Temperoparietal locus (most likely) – Middle meningeal artery Frontal locus – anterior ethmoidal artery Occipital locus – transverse or sigmoid sinuses Vertex locus – superior sagittal sinus	Bridging veins
Symptoms (depending on the severity)	Lucid interval followed by unconsciousness	Gradually increasing headache and confusion
CT scan appearance	Biconvex lens	Crescent-shaped

Extra-axial hemorrhage, bleeding that occurs within the skull but outside of the brain tissue, falls into three subtypes:

- Epidural hemorrhage (extradural hemorrhage) which occur between the dura mater (the outermost meninx) and the skull, is caused by trauma. It may result from laceration of an artery, most commonly the middle meningeal artery. This is a very dangerous type of injury because the bleed is from a high-pressure system and deadly increases in intracranial pressure can result rapidly. However, it is the least common type of meningeal bleeding and is seen in 1% to 3% cases of head injury.
  - Patients have a loss of consciousness (LOC), then a lucid interval, then sudden deterioration (vomiting, restlessness, LOC)
  - Head CT shows lenticular (convex) deformity.
- Subdural hemorrhage results from tearing of the bridging veins in the subdural space between the dura and arachnoid mater.
  - Head CT shows crescent-shaped deformity
- Subarachnoid hemorrhage, which occur between the arachnoid and pia meningeal layers, like intraparenchymal hemorrhage, can result either from trauma or from ruptures of aneurysms or arteriovenous malformations. Blood is seen layering into the brain along sulci and fissures, or filling cisterns (most often the suprasellar cistern because of the presence of the vessels of the circle of Willis and their branch points within that space). The classic presentation of subarachnoid hemorrhage is the sudden onset of a severe headache (a thunderclap headache). This can be a very dangerous entity and requires emergent neurosurgical evaluation and sometimes urgent intervention.

==== Cerebral contusion ====
Cerebral contusion is bruising of the brain tissue. The pia mater is not breached in contusion in contrary to lacerations. The majority of contusions occur in the frontal and temporal lobes. Complications may include cerebral edema and transtentorial herniation. The goal of treatment should be to treat the increased intracranial pressure. The prognosis is guarded.

==== Diffuse axonal injury ====
Diffuse axonal injury, or DAI, usually occurs as the result of an acceleration or deceleration motion, not necessarily an impact. Axons are stretched and damaged when parts of the brain of differing density slide over one another. Prognoses vary widely depending on the extent of the damage.

==== Compound head injury ====
Overlying scalp laceration and soft tissue disruption in continuity with a skull fracture constitutes "compound head injury", and has higher rates of infection, unfavorable neurologic outcome, delayed seizures, mortality, and duration of hospital stay.

== Signs and symptoms ==
Three categories used for classifying the severity of brain injuries are mild, moderate or severe.

=== Mild brain injuries ===
Symptoms of a mild brain injury include headaches, confusion, ringing ears, fatigue, changes in sleep patterns, mood or behavior. Other symptoms include trouble with memory, concentration, attention or thinking. Mental fatigue is a common debilitating experience and may not be linked by the patient to the original (minor) incident. Narcolepsy and sleep disorders are common misdiagnoses.

=== Moderate/severe brain injuries ===
Cognitive symptoms include confusion, aggression, abnormal behavior, slurred speech, and coma or other disorders of consciousness. Physical symptoms include headaches that do not go away or worsen, vomiting or nausea, convulsions or seizures, abnormal dilation of the eyes, inability to awaken from sleep, weakness in the extremities, and a loss of coordination. In cases of severe brain injuries, the likelihood of areas with permanent disability is great, including neurocognitive deficits, delusions (often, to be specific, monothematic delusions), speech or movement problems, and intellectual disability. There may also be personality changes. The most severe cases result in coma or even persistent vegetative state.

=== Symptoms in children ===
Symptoms observed in children include changes in eating habits, persistent irritability or sadness, changes in attention, disrupted sleeping habits, or loss of interest in toys.

Presentation varies according to the injury. Some patients with head trauma stabilize and other patients deteriorate. A patient may present with or without neurological deficit. Patients with concussion may have a history of seconds to minutes unconsciousness, then normal arousal. Disturbance of vision and equilibrium may also occur. Common symptoms of head injury include coma, confusion, drowsiness, personality change, seizures, nausea and vomiting, headache and a lucid interval, during which a patient appears conscious only to deteriorate later.

Symptoms of skull fracture can include:

- leaking cerebrospinal fluid (a clear fluid drainage from nose, mouth or ear) is strongly indicative of basilar skull fracture and the tearing of sheaths surrounding the brain, which can lead to secondary brain infection.
- visible deformity or depression in the head or face; for example a sunken eye can indicate a maxillar fracture
- an eye that cannot move or is deviated to one side can indicate that a broken facial bone is pinching a nerve that innervates eye muscles
- wounds or bruises on the scalp or face.
- Basilar skull fractures, those that occur at the base of the skull, are associated with Battle's sign, a subcutaneous bleed over the mastoid, hemotympanum, and cerebrospinal fluid rhinorrhea and otorrhea.

Because brain injuries can be life-threatening, even people with apparently slight injuries, with no noticeable signs or complaints, require close observation; They have a chance for severe symptoms later on. The caretakers of those patients with mild trauma who are released from the hospital are frequently advised to rouse the patient several times during the next 12 to 24 hours to assess for worsening symptoms.

The Glasgow Coma Scale (GCS) is a tool for measuring the degree of unconsciousness and is thus a useful tool for determining the severity of the injury. The Pediatric Glasgow Coma Scale is used in young children. The widely used PECARN Pediatric Head Injury/Trauma Algorithm helps physicians weigh risk-benefit of imaging in a clinical setting given multiple factors about the patient—including mechanism/location of the injury, age of the patient, and GCS score.

=== Location of brain damage predicts symptoms ===
Symptoms of brain injuries can also be influenced by the location of the injury and as a result, impairments are specific to the part of the brain affected. Lesion size is correlated with severity, recovery, and comprehension. Brain injuries often create impairment or disability that can vary greatly in severity.

Studies show there is a correlation between brain lesion and language, speech, and category-specific disorders. Wernicke's aphasia is associated with anomia, unknowingly making up words (neologisms), and problems with comprehension. The symptoms of Wernicke's aphasia are caused by damage to the posterior section of the superior temporal gyrus.

Damage to the Broca's area typically produces symptoms like omitting functional words (agrammatism), sound production changes, dyslexia, dysgraphia, and problems with comprehension and production. Broca's aphasia is indicative of damage to the posterior inferior frontal gyrus of the brain.

An impairment following damage to a region of the brain does not necessarily imply that the damaged area is wholly responsible for the cognitive process which is impaired, however. For example, in pure alexia, the ability to read is destroyed by a lesion damaging both the left visual field and the connection between the right visual field and the language areas (Broca's area and Wernicke's area). However, this does not mean someone with pure alexia is incapable of comprehending speech—merely that there is no connection between their working visual cortex and language areas—as is demonstrated by the fact that pure alexics can still write, speak, and even transcribe letters without understanding their meaning. Lesions to the fusiform gyrus often result in prosopagnosia, the inability to distinguish faces and other complex objects from each other. Lesions in the amygdala would eliminate the enhanced activation seen in occipital and fusiform visual areas in response to fear with the area intact. Amygdala lesions change the functional pattern of activation to emotional stimuli in regions that are distant from the amygdala.

Other lesions to the visual cortex have different effects depending on the location of the damage. Lesions to V1, for example, can cause blindsight in different areas of the brain depending on the size of the lesion and location relative to the calcarine fissure. Lesions to V4 can cause color-blindness, and bilateral lesions to MT/V5 can cause the loss of the ability to perceive motion. Lesions to the parietal lobes may result in agnosia, an inability to recognize complex objects, smells, or shapes, or amorphosynthesis, a loss of perception on the opposite side of the body.

== Causes ==
Head injuries can be caused by a large variety of reasons. All of these causes can be put into two categories used to classify head injuries; those that occur from impact (blows) and those that occur from shaking. Common causes of head injury due to impact are motor vehicle traffic collisions, home and occupational accidents, falls, assault, and sports related accidents. Head injuries from shaking are most common amongst infants and children.

According to the United States CDC, 32% of traumatic brain injuries (another, more specific, term for head injuries) are caused by falls, 10% by assaults, 16.5% by being struck by or against something, 17% by motor vehicle accidents, and 21% by other/unknown ways. In addition, the highest rate of injury is among children ages 0–14 and adults age 65 and older. Brain injuries that include brain damage can also be brought on by exposure to toxic chemicals, lack of oxygen, tumors, infections, and stroke. Possible causes of widespread brain damage include birth hypoxia, prolonged hypoxia (shortage of oxygen), poisoning by teratogens (including alcohol), infection, and neurological illness. Brain tumors can increase intracranial pressure, causing brain damage.

== Diagnosis ==
There are a few methods used to diagnose a head injury. A healthcare professional will ask the patient questions revolving around the injury as well as questions to help determine in what ways the injury is affecting function. In addition to this hearing, vision, balance, and reflexes may also be assessed as an indicator of the severity of the injury. A non-contrast CT of the head should be performed immediately in all those who have sustained a moderate or severe head injury. A CT is an imaging technique that allows physicians to see inside the head without surgery in order to determine if there is internal bleeding or swelling in the brain. Computed tomography (CT) has become the diagnostic modality of choice for head trauma due to its accuracy, reliability, safety, and wide availability. The changes in microcirculation, impaired auto-regulation, cerebral edema, and axonal injury start as soon as a head injury occurs and manifest as clinical, biochemical, and radiological changes. An MRI may also be conducted to determine if someone has abnormal growths or tumors in the brain or to determine if the patient has had a stroke.

Glasgow Coma Scale (GCS) is the most widely used scoring system used to assess the level of severity of a brain injury. This method is based on objective observations of specific traits to determine the severity of a brain injury. It is based on three traits: eye-opening, verbal response, and motor response, which are gauged as described below.

Based on the Glasgow Coma Scale severity is classified as follows:

- severe brain injuries score 3–8,
- moderate brain injuries score 9–12, and
- mild brain injuries score 13–15.

There are several imaging techniques that can aid in diagnosing and assessing the extent of brain damage, including:

- computed tomography (CT) scan
- magnetic resonance imaging (MRI)
- diffusion tensor imaging (DTI) and magnetic resonance spectroscopy (MRS)
- positron emission tomography (PET)
- single-photon emission tomography (SPECT)

CT scans and MRI are the two techniques widely used and are the most effective. CT scans can show brain bleeds, fractures of the skull, fluid build up in the brain that will lead to increased cranial pressure. MRI is able to better detect smaller injuries, detect damage within the brain, diffuse axonal injury, injuries to the brainstem, posterior fossa, and subtemporal and sub frontal regions. However, patients with pacemakers, metallic implants, or other metal within their bodies are unable to have an MRI done. Typically the other imaging techniques are not used in a clinical setting because of the cost, lack of availability.

== Management ==
Most head injuries are of a benign nature and require no treatment beyond analgesics such as acetaminophen. Non-steroidal painkillers such as ibuprofen are avoided since they could make any potential bleeding worse. Due to the high risk of even minor brain injuries, close monitoring for potential complications such as intracranial bleeding. If the brain has been severely damaged by trauma, a neurosurgical evaluation may be useful. Treatments may involve controlling elevated intracranial pressure. This can include sedation, paralytics, cerebrospinal fluid diversion. Second-line alternatives include decompressive craniectomy (Jagannathan et al. found a net 65% favorable outcomes rate in pediatric patients), barbiturate coma, hypertonic saline, and hypothermia. Although all of these methods have potential benefits, there has been no randomized study that has shown unequivocal benefit.

Clinicians will often consult clinical decision support rules such as the Canadian CT Head Rule or the New Orleans/Charity Head injury/Trauma Rule to decide if the patient needs further imaging studies or observation only. Rules like these are usually studied in depth by multiple research groups with large patient cohorts to ensure accuracy given the risk of adverse events in this area.

There is a subspecialty certification available for brain injury medicine that signifies expertise in the treatment of brain injury.

== Prognosis ==
Prognosis, or the likely progress of a disorder, depends on the nature, location, and cause of the brain damage (see Traumatic brain injury, Focal and diffuse brain injury, Primary and secondary brain injury).

In children with uncomplicated minor head injuries the risk of intracranial bleeding over the next year is rare at 2 cases per 1 million. In some cases transient neurological disturbances may occur, lasting minutes to hours. Malignant post traumatic cerebral swelling can develop unexpectedly in stable patients after an injury, as can post-traumatic seizures. Recovery in children with neurologic deficits will vary. Children with neurologic deficits who improve daily are more likely to recover, while those who are vegetative for months are less likely to improve. Most patients without deficits have full recovery. However, persons who sustain head trauma resulting in unconsciousness for an hour or more have twice the risk of developing Alzheimer's disease later in life.

Head injury may be associated with a neck injury. Bruises on the back or neck, neck pain, or pain radiating to the arms are signs of cervical spine injury and merit spinal immobilization via application of a cervical collar and possibly a longboard. If the neurological exam is normal this is reassuring. Reassessment is needed if there is a worsening headache, seizure, one-sided weakness, or has persistent vomiting.

To combat overuse of head CT scans yielding negative intracranial hemorrhage results, which unnecessarily exposes patients to radiation and increase time in the hospital and cost of the visit, multiple clinical decision support rules have been developed to help clinicians weigh the option to scan a patient with a head injury. Among these are the Canadian Head CT rule, the PECARN Head Injury/Trauma Algorithm, and the New Orleans/Charity Head Injury/Trauma Rule all help clinicians make these decisions using easily obtained information and noninvasive practices.

Brain injuries are very hard to predict in the outcome. Many tests and specialists are needed to determine the likelihood of the prognosis. People with minor brain damage can have debilitating side effects; not just severe brain damage has debilitating effects. The side-effects of a brain injury depend on location and the body's response to injury. Even a mild concussion can have long term effects that may not resolve.

== History ==
The foundation for understanding human behavior and brain injury can be attributed to the case of Phineas Gage and the famous case studies by Paul Broca. The first case study on Phineas Gage's head injury is one of the most astonishing brain injuries in history. In 1848, Phineas Gage was paving way for a new railroad line when he encountered an accidental explosion of a tamping iron straight through his frontal lobe. Gage observed to be intellectually unaffected, but exemplified post-injury behavioral deficits, including becoming sporadic, disrespectful, extremely profane, and giving no regard for other workers. Gage started having seizures in February 1860, dying only four months later on May 21, 1860.

Ten years later, Paul Broca examined two patients exhibiting impaired speech due to frontal lobe injuries. Broca's first patient, Leborgne, lacked productive speech, which Broca saw as an opportunity to address language localization; when the patient, formally known as "tan", died, Broca confirmed the frontal lobe lesion on autopsy. The second patient had similar speech impairments, supporting his findings on language localization. The results of both cases became a vital verification of the relationship between speech and the left cerebral hemisphere. The affected areas are known today as Broca's area and Broca's Aphasia.

A few years later, a German neuroscientist, Carl Wernicke, consulted on a stroke patient. The patient experienced neither speech nor hearing impairments but had a few brain deficits. These deficits included: lacking the ability to comprehend what was spoken to him and the words written down. After his death, Wernicke examined his autopsy that found a lesion located in the left temporal region. This area became known as Wernicke's area. Wernicke later hypothesized the relationship between Wernicke's area and Broca's area, which was proven fact.

== Epidemiology ==
Head injury is the leading cause of death in many countries.

== See also ==
- Cerebral palsy – Movement disorders that appear in early childhood
- Encephalopathy – Disorders or diseases of the brain
- Epilepsy – Group of neurological disorders causing seizures
- Fetal alcohol spectrum disorder – Group of conditions resulting from maternal alcohol consumption during pregnancy
- Frontal lobe injury – Type of brain injury
- Concussion
- Infinity Walk – Therapeutic method for progressively developing coordination
- Lobotomy – Discredited neurosurgical operation
- Myogenesis – Formation of muscular tissue, particularly during embryonic development
- Nerve injury – Damage to nervous tissue
- Neurocognition – Cognitive functions linked to specific neural systems
- Neurology – Medical specialty dealing with disorders of the nervous system
- Primary and secondary brain injury – Medical condition
- Rehabilitation (neuropsychology) – Therapy to regain or improve neurocognitive function that has been lost or diminished
- Synaptogenesis – Formation of neuronal junctions in the nervous system
- Traumatic brain injury – Injury of the brain from an external source
- Brain injury – Destruction or degeneration of brain cells
- Acquired brain injury – Brain damage caused by events after birth
- Neurodegeneration – Central nervous system disease
- Chronic traumatic encephalopathy – Neurodegenerative disease caused by head injury
