= Coup and contrecoup injury =

Type of head injury

When the head strikes a fixed object, the coup injury occurs at the site of impact and the contrecoup injury occurs at the opposite side.

In head injury, a coup injury occurs under the site of impact with an object, and a contrecoup injury occurs on the side opposite the area that was hit. Coup and contrecoup injuries are associated with cerebral contusions, a type of traumatic brain injury in which the brain is bruised. Coup and contrecoup injuries can occur individually, or together as a coup–contrecoup injury. When a moving object impacts the stationary head, coup injuries are typical, while contrecoup injuries are produced when the moving head strikes a stationary object.

Coup and contrecoup injuries are considered focal brain injuries – those that occur in a particular spot in the brain – as opposed to diffuse injuries, which occur over a more widespread area. Diffuse axonal injury is the most prevalent pathology of coup contrecoup.

The exact mechanism for the injuries, especially contrecoup injuries, is a subject of much debate. In general, they involve an abrupt deceleration of the head, causing the brain to collide with the inside of the skull. It is likely that inertia is involved in the injuries, e.g. when the brain keeps moving after the skull is stopped by a fixed object or when the brain remains still after the skull is accelerated by an impact with a moving object. Additionally, increased intracranial pressure and movement of cerebrospinal fluid following a trauma may play a role in the injury.

== Mechanisms ==
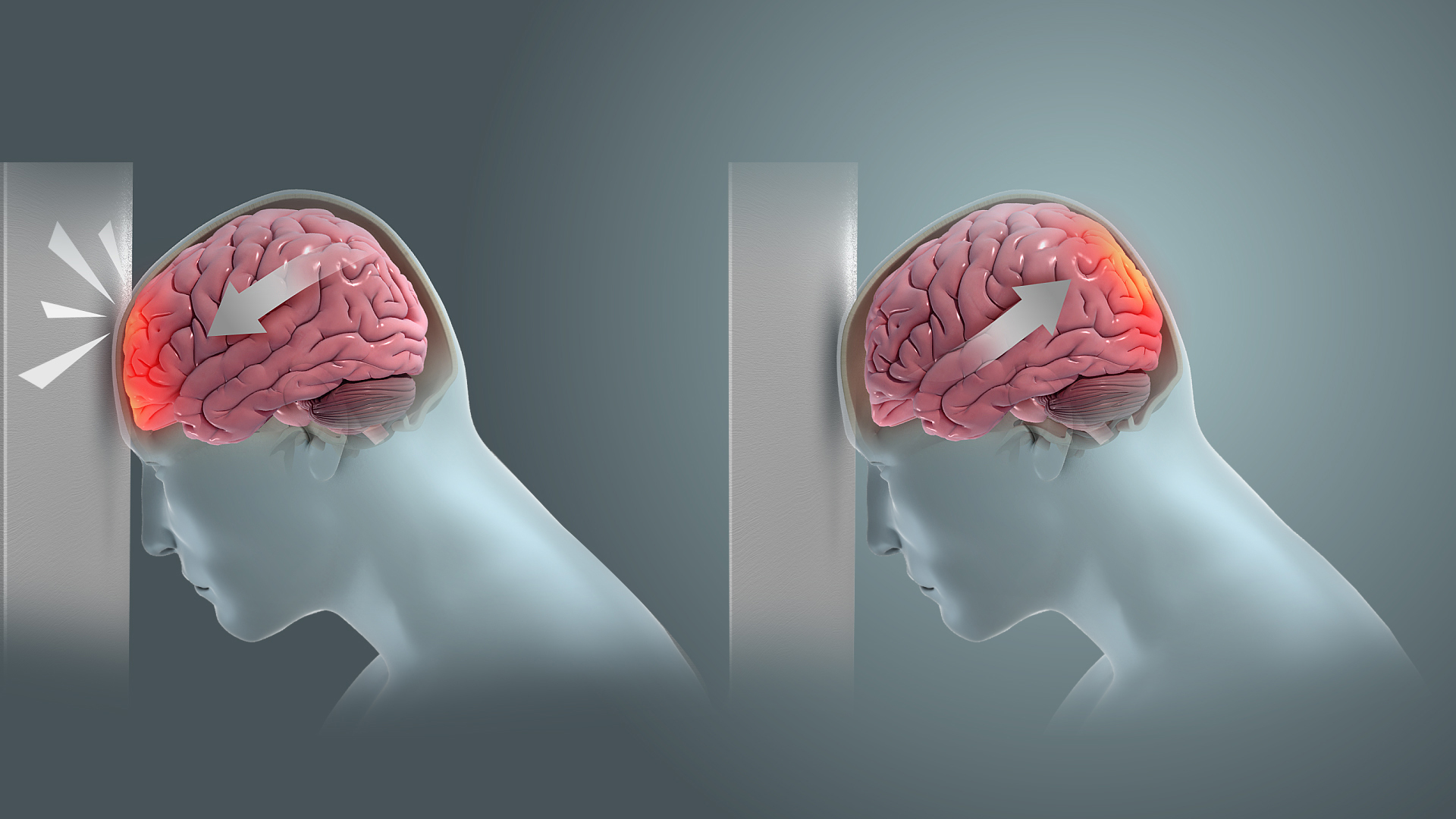
Coup contrecoup injury.

Coup injury may be caused when, during an impact, the brain undergoes linear acceleration and deceleration forces or rotational forces, causing it to collide with the opposite side of the skull. The injuries can also be caused solely by acceleration or deceleration in the absence of an impact. Contrecoup injury may be produced by tensile forces. These forces directly disrupt neurons, axons, other neural and meningeal structures, and blood vessels in local or diffuse patterns, typically leading to various cellular, neurochemical and metabolic effects.

== Features ==
Contrecoup, which may occur in shaken baby syndrome and vehicle accidents, can cause diffuse axonal injury. In some circumstances, concussive injury can cause microvascular disruption, hemorrhage, or subdural hematoma.

Closed head injury (coup contrecoup) can damage more than the impact sites on the brain, as axon bundles may be torn or twisted, blood vessels may rupture, and elevated intracranial pressure can distort the walls of the ventricles. Diffuse axonal injury is a key pathology in concussive brain injury. The visual system may be affected.

Contrecoup contusions are particularly common in the lower part of the frontal lobes and the front part of the temporal lobes. Injuries that occur in body parts other than the brain, such as the lens of the eye, the lung, and the skull may also result from concussion.

== History ==
In the 17th century, Jean Louis Petit described contrecoup injuries. In 1766, the French surgeon Antoine Louis coordinated a meeting of the Académie Royale de Chirurgie on contrecoup injuries, at which papers were to be presented, one of which would be chosen to receive the respected prize, the Prix de l'Académie Royale de Chirurgie. The presenter of the chosen paper was not awarded the prize because he failed to make recommended changes. In 1768, the group met again on the topic, and Louis Sebastian Saucerotte won the prize for his paper describing contrecoup injuries in humans and experiments on animals and recommending treatments such as bloodletting and application of herbs to patients' heads.

== In popular culture ==
- In the Perry Mason TV series, contrecoup lacerations were used as evidence in at least two episodes, including "The Case of the Jaded Joker" (1959) and "The Case of the Bluffing Blast" (1963).
- In "Hawkeye", an episode of M*A*S*H, Captain Hawkeye Pierce, M.D. diagnoses himself as having a contrecoup injury.
- In "Meld", an episode of Star Trek: Voyager, the ship's doctor is able to use the distinction between coup injury and contrecoup injury to determine that a dead crewman was murdered.
- "Contrecoup" is the title of a They Might Be Giants song off their 2007 album The Else. It was written as a challenge to create a song using the words "contrecoup", "craniosophic", and "limerent", and likens an infatuation to the effects of a traumatic brain injury.
- In Stephen King's novel Duma Key, the main character has brain damage from a contrecoup injury (spelled "contracoup").
- The distinction between coup and contrecoup injuries is described and portrayed in "Betrayal, Part 2", a 2019 episode of the BBC television drama series Silent Witness.
