= Primary and secondary brain injury =

Medical condition

Primary and secondary brain injury are ways to classify the injury processes that occur in brain injury. In traumatic brain injury (TBI), primary brain injury occurs during the initial insult, and results from displacement of the physical structures of the brain. Secondary brain injury occurs gradually and may involve an array of cellular processes. Secondary injury, which is not caused by mechanical damage, can result from the primary injury or be independent of it. The fact that people sometimes deteriorate after brain injury was originally taken to mean that secondary injury was occurring. It is not well understood how much of a contribution primary and secondary injuries respectively have to the clinical manifestations of TBI.

Primary and secondary injuries occur in instances other than a TBI, such as spinal cord injury and stroke.

== Primary ==
Examples in traumatic brain injury
Primary	Secondary
Intracerebral hemorrhage; Subdural hemorrhage; Subarachnoid hemorrhage; Epidural hemorrhage; Cerebral contusion; Cerebral laceration; Axonal stretch injury	Cerebral edema; Impaired metabolism; Altered cerebral blood flow; Free radical formation; Excitotoxicity

In TBI, primary injuries result immediately from the initial trauma. Primary injury occurs at the moment of trauma and includes contusion, damage to blood vessels, and axonal shearing, in which the axons of neurons are stretched and torn. The blood brain barrier and meninges may be damaged in the primary injury, and neurons may die. Cells are killed in a nonspecific manner in primary injury. Tissues have a deformation threshold: if they are deformed past this threshold they are injured. Different regions in the brain may be more sensitive to mechanical loading due to differences in their properties that result from differences in their makeup; for example, myelinated tissues may have different properties than other tissues. Thus some tissues may experience more force and be more injured in the primary injury. The primary injury leads to the secondary injury.

== Secondary ==
Secondary injury is an indirect result of the injury. It results from processes initiated by the trauma. It occurs in the hours and days following the primary injury and plays a large role in the brain damage and death that results from TBI. Unlike in most forms of trauma a large percentage of the people killed by brain trauma do not die right away but rather days to weeks after the event. In addition, rather than improving after being hospitalized as most patients with other types of injuries do, about 40% of people with TBI deteriorate. This is often a result of secondary injury, which can damage neurons that were unharmed in the primary injury. It occurs after a variety of brain injury including subarachnoid hemorrhage, stroke, and traumatic brain injury and involves metabolic cascades.

Secondary injury can result from complications of the injury. These include ischemia (insufficient blood flow); cerebral hypoxia (insufficient oxygen in the brain); hypotension (low blood pressure); cerebral edema (swelling of the brain); changes in the blood flow to the brain; and raised intracranial pressure (the pressure within the skull). If intracranial pressure gets too high, it can lead to deadly brain herniation, in which parts of the brain are squeezed past structures in the skull.

Other secondary injury include hypercapnia (excessive carbon dioxide levels in the blood), acidosis (excessively acidic blood), meningitis, and brain abscess. In addition, alterations in the release of neurotransmitters (the chemicals used by brain cells to communicate) can cause secondary injury. Imbalances in some neurotransmitters can lead to excitotoxicity, damage to brain cells that results from overactivation of biochemical receptors for excitatory neurotransmitters (those that increase the likelihood that a neuron will fire). Excitotoxicity can cause a variety of negative effects, including damage to cells by free radicals, potentially leading to neurodegeneration. Another factor in secondary injury is loss of cerebral autoregulation, the ability of the brain's blood vessels to regulate cerebral blood flow. Other factors in secondary damage are breakdown of the blood–brain barrier, edema, ischemia and hypoxia. Ischemia is one of the leading causes of secondary brain damage after head trauma. Similar mechanisms are involved in secondary injury after ischemia, trauma, and injuries resulting when a person does not get enough oxygen. After stroke, an ischemic cascade, a set of biochemical cascades takes place.

== Prevention ==
Since primary injury occurs at the moment of trauma and is over so rapidly, little can be done to interfere with it other than prevention of the trauma itself. However, since secondary injury occurs over time, it can be prevented in part by taking measures to prevent complications such as hypoxia (oxygen deficiency). Furthermore, secondary injury presents opportunities for researchers to find drug therapies to limit or prevent the damage. Since a variety of processes occur in secondary injury, any treatments that are developed to halt or mitigate it will need to address more than one of these mechanisms.

Thus efforts to reduce disability and death from TBI are thought to be best aimed at secondary injury, because the primary injury is thought to be irreversible.

== See also ==
- Wallerian degeneration
