= Contrecoup =

Contrecoup may refer to:

- Contrecoup injury, a head injury on the side opposite the area that was hit
- Counter-coup, one coup d'état countering another
- "Contrecoup", a track on The Else, a 2007 album by They Might Be Giants
