= Focal and diffuse brain injury =

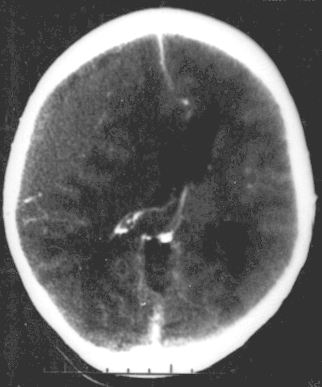
- Epidural hematoma, an example of a focal injury

Focal and diffuse brain injury are ways to classify brain injury: focal injury occurs in a specific location, while diffuse injury occurs over a more widespread area. It is common for both focal and diffuse damage to occur as a result of the same event; many traumatic brain injuries have aspects of both focal and diffuse injury. Focal injuries are commonly associated with an injury in which the head strikes or is struck by an object; diffuse injuries are more often found in acceleration/deceleration injuries, in which the head does not necessarily contact anything, but brain tissue is damaged because tissue types with varying densities accelerate at different rates. In addition to physical trauma, other types of brain injury, such as stroke, can also produce focal and diffuse injuries. There may be primary and secondary brain injury processes.

== Focal ==
A focal traumatic injury results from direct mechanical forces (such as occur when the head strikes a windshield in a vehicle accident) and is usually associated with brain tissue damage visible to the naked eye. A common cause of focal injury is penetrating head injury, in which the skull is perforated, as frequently occurs in auto accidents, blows, and gunshot wounds. Focal injuries typically have symptoms that are related to the damaged area of the brain. Stroke can produce focal damage that is associated with signs and symptoms that correspond to the part of the brain that was damaged. For example, if a speech center of the brain such as Broca's area is damaged, problems with speech are common.

Focal injuries include the following:

- Cerebral contusion is a bruise of brain tissue that commonly results from contact of the brain with the inside of the skull.
- Cerebral laceration is a brain injury in which the pia-arachnoid is torn.
- Epidural hemorrhage is bleeding between the dura mater and the skull. It is commonly associated with damage to the middle meningeal artery, often resulting from a skull fracture.
- Subdural hemorrhage is bleeding between the dura mater and the arachnoid.
- Intracerebral hemorrhage is bleeding within the brain tissue itself.
- Intraventricular hemorrhage is bleeding within the ventricles of the brain.

== Diffuse ==
Diffuse injuries, also called multifocal injuries, include brain injury due to hypoxia, meningitis, and damage to blood vessels. Unlike focal injuries, which are usually easy to detect using imaging, diffuse injuries may be difficult to detect and define; often, much of the damage is microscopic. Diffuse injuries can result from acceleration/deceleration injuries. Rotational forces are a common cause of diffuse injuries; these forces are common in diffuse injuries such as concussion and diffuse axonal injury. The term "diffuse" has been called a misnomer, since injury is often actually multifocal, with multiple locations of injury.

Diffuse injuries include the following:

- Diffuse axonal injury is widespread damage to the white matter of the brain that usually results from acceleration/deceleration types of injury.
- Ischemic brain injury resulting from an insufficient blood supply to the brain, is one of the leading causes of secondary brain damage after head trauma.
- Vascular injury usually causes death shortly after an injury. Although it is a diffuse type of brain injury itself, diffuse vascular injury is generally more likely to be caused by focal than diffuse injury.
- Swelling, commonly seen after TBI, can lead to dangerous increases in intracranial pressure. Though swelling itself is a diffuse type of injury, it can result from either focal or diffuse injury.

== See also ==
- Focal neurologic deficit
