= Burst lobe =

Brain hemorrhage

A burst lobe is an intracranial hemorrhage affecting a brain lobe (part of the cerebral hemispheres) and characterized by an intracerebral hemorrhage in continuity with a subdural hemorrhage and contusion.

On a CT scan, it is shown as an irregular area of increased density which corresponds to a blood clot. This is surrounded by a low density area of oedema.
