= Deviated gaze =

Abnormal movement of the eyes

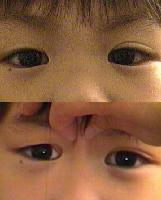
Two images of the same child. The top image shows the left eye slightly cross-eyed. This is fixed in the bottom picture by stretching the extra skin around the eye.

A deviated gaze is an abnormal movement of the eyes. It is often found as a symptom for subdural hematoma or some people may have it from birth.

== Cause ==
A deviated gaze can result from several complications. If the bones and skin on the face are causing the eyes to spread too far apart, the eyes may start moving by themselves without cooperating with each other. Each eye then becomes influenced by what it views and each is focused on that view, causing the deviation. Deviated gaze can also be caused by trauma, neurological disorders and epilepsy.
