= Cerebral laceration =

Brain injury in which neural tissue is cut or torn

- Specialty: Neurosurgery

A cerebral laceration is a type of traumatic brain injury that occurs when the tissue of the brain is mechanically cut or torn. The injury is similar to a cerebral contusion; however, according to their respective definitions, the pia-arachnoid membranes are torn over the site of injury in laceration and are not torn in contusion. Lacerations require greater physical force to cause than contusions, but the two types of injury are grouped together in the ICD-9 and ICD-10 classification systems.

== Signs and symptoms ==
A fifth of people with cerebral lacerations have a lucid interval and no significant changes in level of consciousness. The level of consciousness decreases as the laceration bleeds and blood begins to build up within the skull.

=== Associated injuries ===
Cerebral lacerations usually accompany other brain injuries and are often found with skull fractures on both sides of the head. Frequently occurring in the same areas as contusions, lacerations are particularly common in the inferior frontal lobes and the poles of the temporal lobes. When associated with diffuse axonal injury, the corpus callosum and the brain stem are common locations for laceration. Lacerations are very common in penetrating and perforating head trauma and frequently accompany skull fractures; however, they may also occur in the absence of skull fracture. Lacerations, which may result when brain tissue is stretched, are associated with intraparenchymal bleeding (bleeding into the brain tissue).

== Prognosis ==
A cerebral laceration with large amounts of blood apparent on a CT scan is an indicator of poor prognosis. The progression and course of complications (health effects that result from but are distinct from the injury itself) do not appear to be affected by a cerebral laceration's location or a mass effect it causes.
