= Penetrating head injury =

- Other names: Open-head injury
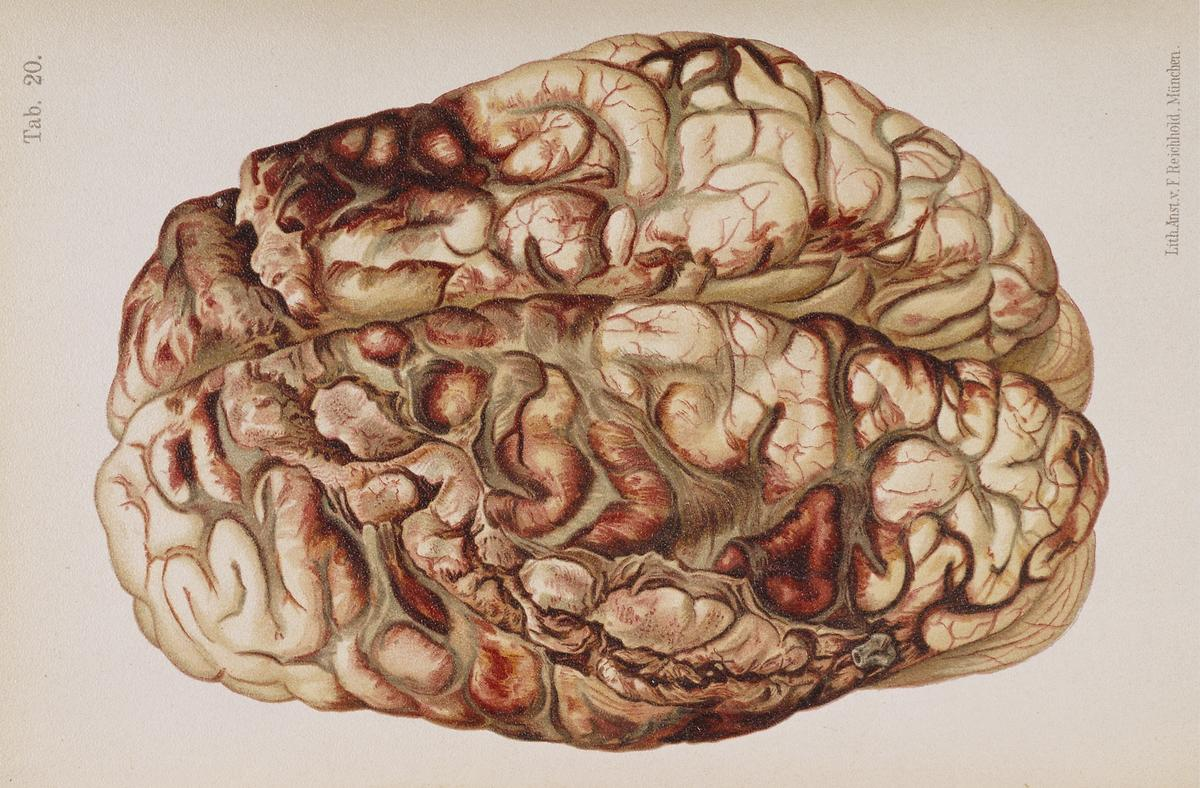
- An illustration of a brain after an "encircling" gunshot wound, showing the common curved pattern of injury caused by a bullet's rapid deceleration upon penetrating the skull and brain matter.
- Specialty: Neurosurgery, Emergency Medicine
- Differential diagnosis: Perforating head injury, Tangential head injury

A penetrating head injury, or open head injury, is a head injury in which, at minimum the dura mater — the outer layer of the meninges — is breached. Penetrating injuries can be caused by high-velocity projectiles or objects of lower velocity such as knives, or bone fragments from a skull fracture that are driven into the brain. Head injuries caused by penetrating trauma are serious medical emergencies and frequently cause irreversable brain damage, permanent disability, or death.

A penetrating head injury involves "a wound in which an object breaches the cranium but does not exit it." In contrast, a perforating head injury is a wound in which the object passes through the head and leaves an exit wound. The causative object does not itself need to necessarily progress through the exit wound it causes. Tangential head injuries refer to incidents where an object induces trauma to the head in such a way that, while it may bounce off the skull, the impact nevertheless is forceful enough to push pieces of the skull into the brain.

== Cause ==
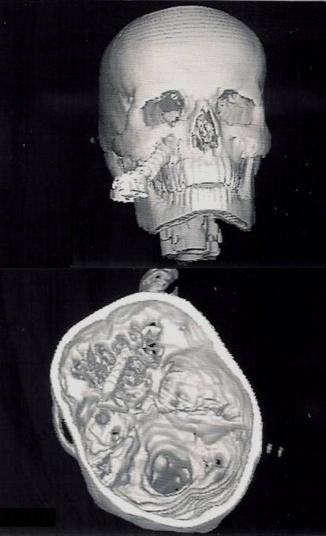
3-D CT scan showing a penetrating head injury by a screwdriver

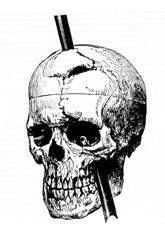
An 1868 illustration showing the perforating head injury of Phineas Gage, a railroad worker who had a tamping iron driven through his skull in an 1848 accident.

In penetrating injury from high-velocity missiles, injuries may occur not only from initial laceration and crushing of brain tissue by the projectile, but also from the subsequent cavitation. High-velocity objects create rotations and can create a shock wave that cause stretch injuries, forming a cavity that is three to four times greater in diameter than the missile itself. A pulsating temporary cavity is also formed by a high-speed missile and can have a diameter 30 times greater than that of the missile. Though this cavity is reduced in size once the force ends, the tissue that was compressed during cavitation remains injured. Destroyed brain tissue may either be ejected from entrance or exit wounds, or packed up against the sides of the cavity formed by the missile.

Low-velocity objects usually cause penetrating injuries in the regions of the skull's temporal bones or orbital surfaces, where the bones are thinner and thus more likely to break. Damage from lower-velocity penetrating injuries is restricted to the tract of the stab wound, because the lower-velocity object does not create as much cavitation. However, low-velocity penetrating objects may ricochet inside the skull, continuing to cause damage until they stop moving.

== Pathophysiology ==
Though it is more likely to cause infection, penetrating trauma is similar to closed head injury such as cerebral contusion or intracranial hemorrhage. As in closed head injury, intracranial pressure is likely to increase due to swelling or bleeding, potentially crushing delicate brain tissue. Most deaths from penetrating trauma are caused by damage to blood vessels, which can lead to intracranial hematomas and ischemia, which can in turn lead to a biochemical cascade called the ischemic cascade. The injury in penetrating brain trauma is mostly focal (that is, it affects a specific area of tissue).

Studies with PET scanning and transcranial Doppler imaging have shown that changes in cerebral blood flow, such as hypoperfusion and vasospasm, can follow penetrating head injury. These changes can last for two weeks. An ischemic cascade similar to the course of cellular and metabolic events that follow other head injuries may follow penetrating head injuries. Sometimes in penetrating injuries, the brain releases thromboplastin, which can lead to problems with blood clotting.

While blunt trauma to the head does not present a risk of shock due to hemorrhage, penetrating head trauma does.

== Diagnosis and treatment ==
A person with a penetrating head injury may be evaluated using X-ray, CT scan, or MRI (MRI can only be used when the penetrating object would not be magnetic, because MRI uses magnetism and could move the object, causing further injury).

Surgery may be required to debride or repair the injury or to relieve excessive intracranial pressure. Intracranial pressure is monitored and attempts are made to maintain it within normal ranges. Intravenous fluids are given and efforts are taken to maintain high blood oxygen levels.

== Prognosis ==
The highest-velocity injuries tend to have the worst associated damage. A study published in 1991, which documented 314 individuals who had had penetrating cranial injuries caused by gunshot wounds, found that 73% died from their injuries at the scene of the incident, and a further 19% ultimately died later, thus indicating a total mortality rate of 92%. Perforating injuries have an even worse prognosis.

Penetrating head trauma can cause impairment or loss of abilities controlled by parts of the brain that are damaged. A famous example is Phineas Gage, whose personality appears to have changed (though not as dramatically as usually described) after a perforating injury to his frontal lobe(s).

People with subarachnoid hemorrhage, a blown pupil, respiratory distress, hypotension, or cerebral vasospasm are more likely to have worse outcomes.

People with penetrating head trauma may have complications such as acute respiratory distress syndrome, disseminated intravascular coagulation, and neurogenic pulmonary edema. Up to 50% of patients with penetrating brain injuries get late-onset post-traumatic epilepsy.

== See also ==
- Brain herniation
- Traumatic brain injury
