= Cerebral contusion =

Bruise of the brain tissue

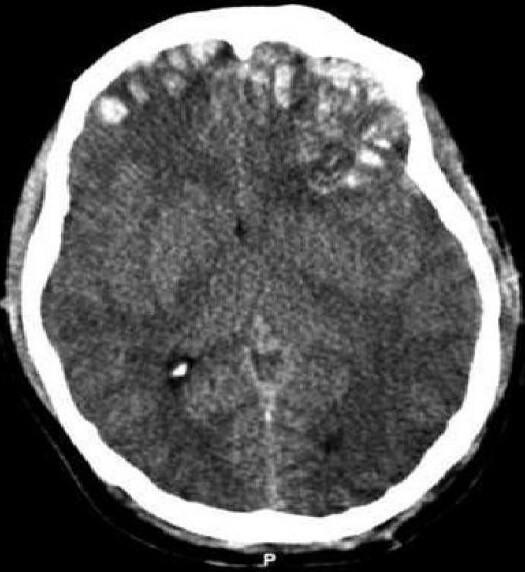
- CT scan showing cerebral contusions, hemorrhage within the hemispheres, subdural hematoma on the left, and skull fractures
- Specialty: Neurosurgery, emergency medicine, neurology
- Complications: Cerebral edema, transtentorial herniation

Cerebral contusion (Latin: contusio cerebri) also known as cranial contusion or cranial bruise, a form of traumatic brain injury, is a bruise of the brain tissue. Like bruises in other tissues, cerebral contusion can be associated with multiple microhemorrhages, small blood vessel leaks into brain tissue. Contusion occurs in 20–30% of severe head injuries. A cerebral laceration is a similar injury except that, according to their respective definitions, the pia-arachnoid membranes are torn over the site of injury in laceration and are not torn in contusion. The injury can cause a decline in mental function in the long term and in the emergency setting may result in brain herniation, a life-threatening condition in which parts of the brain are squeezed past parts of the skull. Thus treatment aims to prevent dangerous rises in intracranial pressure, the pressure within the skull.

Contusions are likely to heal on their own without medical intervention.

== Signs and symptoms ==
The symptoms of a cerebral contusion depend on the severity of the injury, ranging from minor to severe. Individuals may experience a headache, confusion, sleepiness, dizziness, loss of consciousness, nausea and vomiting, seizures, difficulty with coordination and movement, lightheadedness, tinnitus, and spinning sensations. They may also have difficulty with memory, vision, speech, hearing, managing emotions, and thinking. Signs also depend on the contusion's location in the brain.

== Causes ==
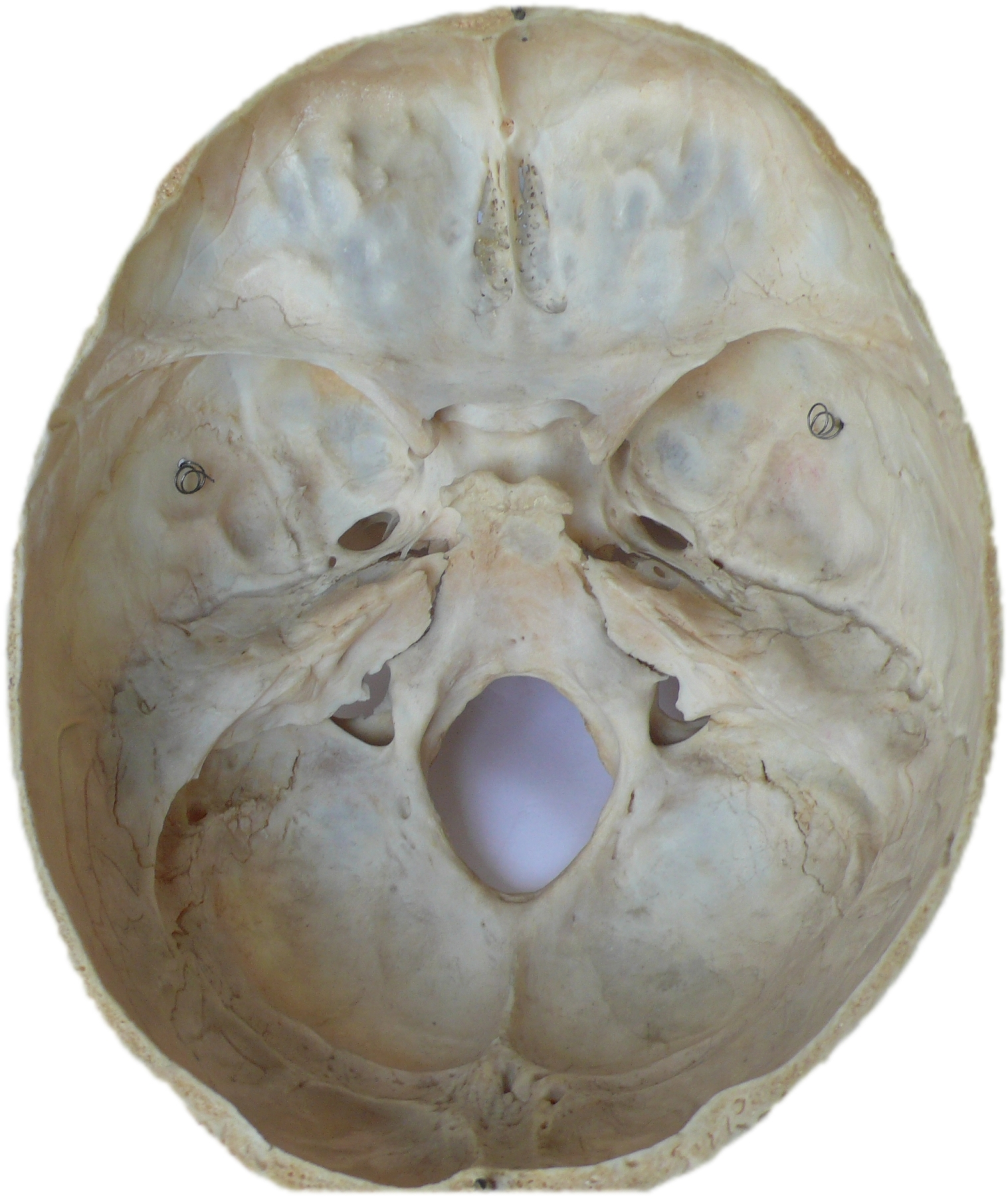
The interior of the skull has sharp ridges by which a moving brain can be injured.

Often caused by a blow to the head, contusions commonly occur in coup or contre-coup injuries. In coup injuries, the brain is injured directly under the area of impact, while in contrecoup injuries it is injured on the side opposite the impact.

Contusions occur primarily in the cortical tissue, especially under the site of impact or in areas of the brain located near sharp ridges on the inside of the skull. The brain may be contused when it collides with bony protuberances on the inside surface of the skull. The protuberances are located on the inside of the skull under the frontal and temporal lobes and on the roof of the ocular orbit. Thus, the tips of the frontal and temporal lobes located near the bony ridges in the skull are areas where contusions frequently occur and are most severe. For this reason, attention, emotional and memory problems, which are associated with damage to frontal and temporal lobes, are much more common in head trauma survivors than are syndromes associated with damage to other areas of the brain.

== Features ==
Contusions, which are frequently associated with edema, are especially likely to cause increases in intracranial pressure (ICP) and concomitant crushing of delicate brain tissue. They typically form in a wedge-shape with the widest part in the outermost part of the brain. The distinction between contusion and intracerebral hemorrhage is blurry because both involve bleeding within the brain tissue; however, an arbitrary cutoff exists that the injury is a contusion if two thirds or less of the tissue involved is blood and a hemorrhage otherwise.

The contusion may cause swelling of the surrounding brain tissue, which may be irritated by toxins released in the contusion. The swelling is worst at around four to six days after the injury. Extensive contusion associated with subdural hematoma is called burst lobe. Cases of a burst frontal or temporal lobe are associated with high mortality and morbidity.

Old or remote contusions are associated with resorption of the injured tissue, resulting in various degrees of cavitation, in addition to the presence of a golden-yellow discoloration due to residual hemosiderin. These remote contusions are often referred to as plaque jaune or yellow plaque.

=== Multiple petechial hemorrhages ===
Numerous small contusions from broken capillaries that occur in grey matter under the cortex are called multiple petechial hemorrhages or multifocal hemorrhagic contusion. Caused by shearing injuries at the time of impact, these contusions occur especially at the junction between grey and white matter and in the upper brain stem, basal ganglia, thalamus and areas near the third ventricle. The hemorrhages can occur as the result of brain herniation, which can cause arteries to tear and bleed. A type of diffuse brain injury, multiple petechial hemorrhages are not always visible using current imaging techniques like CT and MRI scans. This may be the case even if the injury is quite severe, though these may show up days after the injury. Hemorrhages may be larger than in normal contusions if the injury is quite severe. This type of injury has a poor prognosis if the patient is comatose, even with no apparent causes for the coma.

== Treatment ==
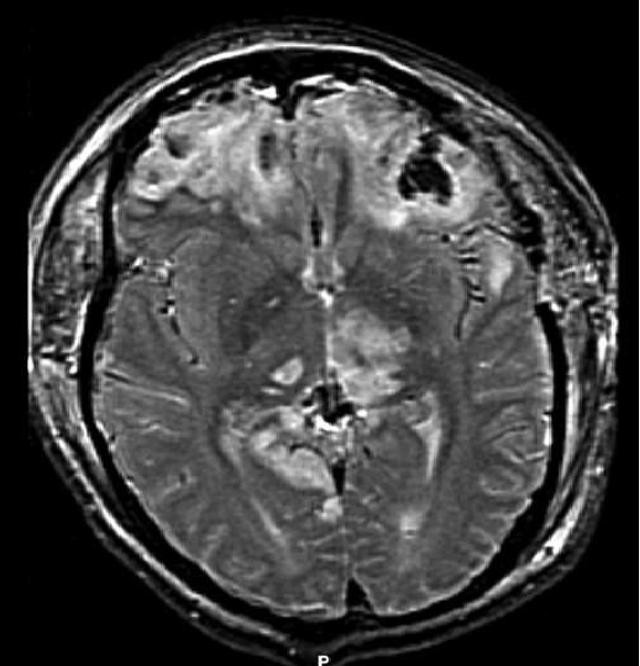
MRI showing damage due to herniation in a patient who had had contusions in the frontal lobes

Since cerebral swelling presents a danger to the patient, treatment of cerebral contusion aims to prevent swelling. Measures to avoid swelling include prevention of hypotension (low blood pressure), hyponatremia (insufficient sodium), and hypercapnia (increased carbon dioxide in the blood). Due to the danger of increased intracranial pressure, surgery may be necessary to reduce it. People with cerebral contusion may require intensive care and close monitoring.
