= Diffuse axonal injury =

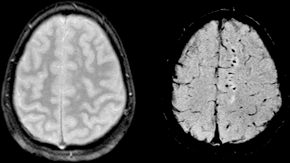
- Two MRI images of a patient with diffuse axonal injury resulting from trauma, at 1.5 tesla field strength. Left: conventional gradient recalled echo (GRE). Right: Susceptibility weighted image (SWI).
- Specialty: Neurology

Diffuse axonal injury (DAI) is a brain injury in which scattered lesions occur over a widespread area in white matter tracts as well as grey matter. DAI is one of the most common and devastating types of traumatic brain injury and is a major cause of unconsciousness and persistent vegetative state after severe head trauma. It occurs in about half of all cases of severe head trauma and may be the primary damage that occurs in concussion. The outcome is frequently coma, with over 90% of patients with severe DAI never regaining consciousness. Those who awaken from the coma often remain significantly impaired.

DAI can occur across the spectrum of traumatic brain injury (TBI) severity, wherein the burden of injury increases from mild to severe. Concussion may be a milder type of diffuse axonal injury.

== Mechanism ==
DAI is the result of traumatic shearing forces that occur when the head is rapidly accelerated or decelerated, as may occur in car accidents, falls, and assaults. Vehicle accidents are the most frequent cause of DAI; it can also occur as the result of child abuse such as in shaken baby syndrome.

Immediate disconnection of axons may be observed in severe brain injury, but the major damage of DAI is delayed secondary axon disconnections, slowly developed over an extended time course. Tracts of axons, which appear white due to myelination, are referred to as white matter. Lesions in both grey and white matter are found in postmortem brains in CT and MRI exams.

Besides mechanical breakage of the axonal cytoskeleton, DAI pathology also includes secondary physiological changes, such as interrupted axonal transport, progressive swellings known as axonal varicosities, and degeneration. Recent studies have linked these changes to twisting and misalignment of broken axon microtubules, as well as tau protein and amyloid precursor protein (APP) deposition.

== Characteristics ==
Lesions typically are found in the white matter of brains injured by DAI; these lesions vary in size from about 1–15 mm and are distributed in a characteristic pattern. DAI most commonly affects white matter in areas including the brain stem, the corpus callosum, and the cerebral hemispheres.

The lobes of the brain most likely to be injured are the frontal and temporal lobes. Other common locations for DAI include the white matter in the cerebral cortex, the superior cerebral peduncles, basal ganglia, thalamus, and deep hemispheric nuclei. These areas may be more easily damaged because of the difference in density between them and the other regions of the brain.

=== Histological characteristics ===
DAI is characterized by axonal separation, in which the axon is torn at the site of stretch, and the part distal to the tear degrades by a process known as Wallerian degeneration. While it was once thought that the main cause of axonal separation was tearing due to mechanical forces during the trauma event, it is now understood that axons are not typically torn upon impact; rather, secondary biochemical cascades, which occur in response to the primary injury (which occurs as the result of mechanical forces at the moment of trauma) and take place hours to days after the initial injury, are largely responsible for the damage to axons.

Though the processes involved in secondary brain injury are still poorly understood, it is now accepted that stretching of axons during injury causes physical disruption to and proteolytic degradation of the cytoskeleton. It also opens sodium channels in the axolemma, which causes voltage-gated calcium channels to open and Ca^{2+} to flow into the cell. The intracellular presence of Ca^{2+} triggers several different pathways, including activating phospholipases and proteolytic enzymes damaging mitochondria and the cytoskeleton, and activating secondary messengers, which can lead to separation of the axon and death of the cell.

=== Cytoskeleton disruption ===
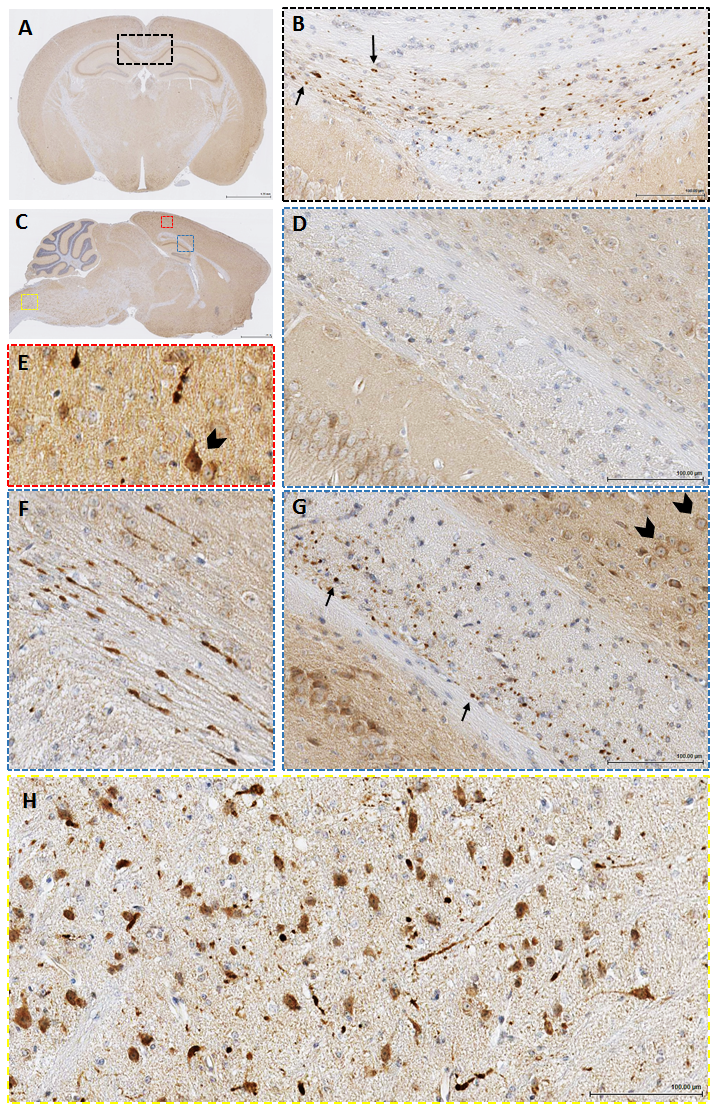
Immunoreactive axonal profiles are observed as either granular (B, G, H) or more elongated, fusiform (F) swellings in the corpus callosum and the brain stem (H) at 24h post traumatic brain injury. Example of APP immunoreactive neurons (arrow heads) observed in the cortex underneath the impact site (E, G). No APP staining was observed in healthy control animals (D).

Axons are normally elastic, but when rapidly stretched, they become brittle, and the axonal cytoskeleton can be broken. Misalignment of cytoskeletal elements after stretch injury can lead to tearing of the axon and death of the neuron. Axonal transport continues up to the point of the cytoskeletal break, but no further, leading to a buildup of transport products and local swelling at that point. When this swelling becomes large enough, it can tear the axon at the site of the cytoskeleton break, causing it to draw back toward the cell body and form a bulb. This bulb is called a "retraction ball", the histological hallmark of diffuse axonal injury.

When the axon is torn, Wallerian degeneration, in which the part of the axon distal to the break degrades, takes place within one to two days after injury. The axolemma disintegrates, myelin breaks down and begins to detach from the cell in an anterograde direction (from the body of the cell toward the end of the axon), and nearby cells begin phagocytic activity, engulfing the cellular debris.

=== Calcium influx ===
While sometimes only the cytoskeleton is disturbed, frequently disruption of the axolemma occurs as well, causing the influx of Ca^{2+} ions into the cell and unleashing a variety of degradational processes. An increase in Ca^{2+} and Na^{+} levels and a drop in K^{+} levels are found within the axon immediately after injury. Possible routes of Ca^{2+} entry include sodium channels, pores formed in the membrane during stretch, and failure of ATP-dependent transporters due to mechanical blockage or lack of available metabolic energy. High levels of intracellular Ca^{2+}, the major cause of post-injury cell damage, destroy mitochondria, and trigger phospholipases and proteolytic enzymes that damage Na+ channels and degrade or alter the cytoskeleton and the axoplasm. Excess Ca^{2+} can also lead to damage to the blood–brain barrier and swelling of the brain.

One of the proteins activated by the presence of calcium in the cell is calpain, a Ca^{2+}-dependent non-lysosomal protease. About 15 minutes to half an hour after the onset of injury, a process called calpain-mediated spectrin proteolysis, or CMSP, begins to occur. Calpain breaks down a molecule called spectrin, which holds the membrane onto the cytoskeleton, causing the formation of blebs and the breakdown of the cytoskeleton and the membrane, and ultimately the death of the cell. Other molecules that can be degraded by calpains are microtubule subunits, microtubule-associated proteins, and neurofilaments.

Generally occurring one to six hours into the process of post-stretch injury, the presence of calcium in the cell initiates the caspase cascade, a process in cell injury that usually leads to apoptosis, or "programmed cell death".

Mitochondria, dendrites, and parts of the cytoskeleton damaged in the injury have a limited ability to heal and regenerate, a process which occurs over two or more weeks. After the injury, astrocytes can shrink, causing parts of the brain to atrophy.

== Diagnosis ==
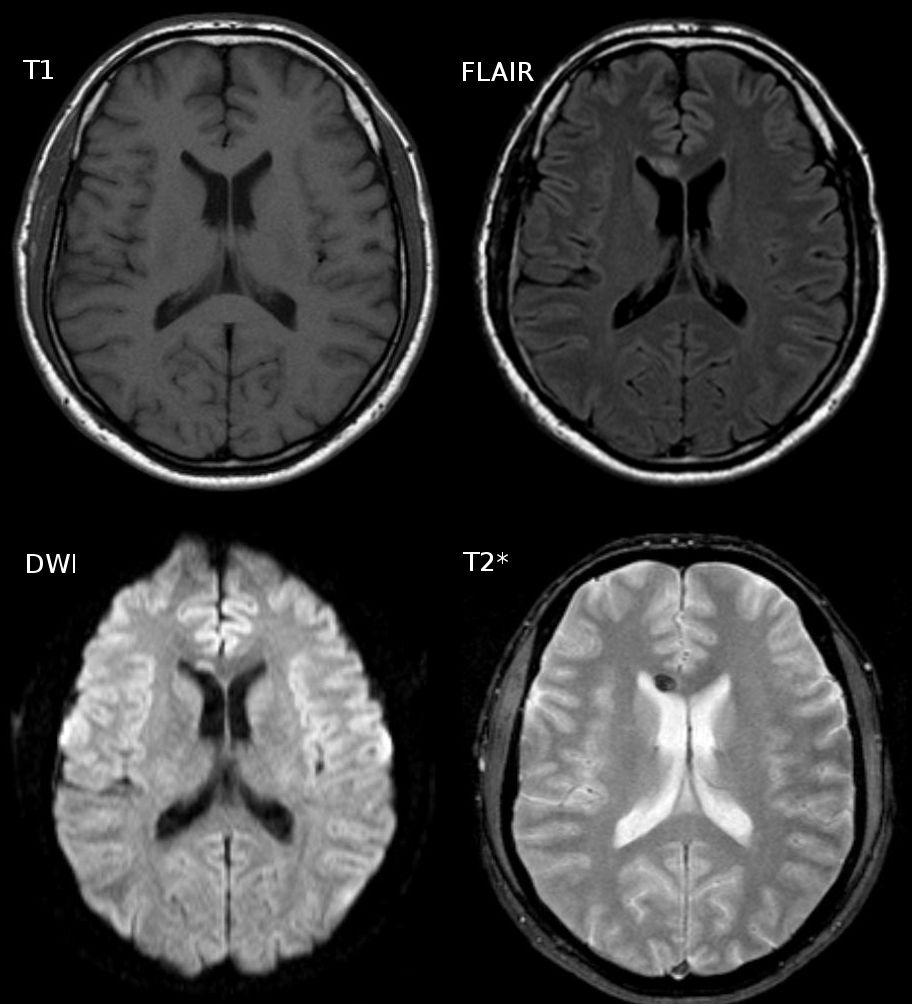
Diffuse axonal injury after a motorcycle accident. MRI after 3 days: on T1-weighted images, the injury is barely visible. On the FLAIR, DWI and T2*-weighted images a small bleed is identifiable.

DAI is difficult to detect since it does not show up well on CT scans or with other macroscopic imaging techniques, though it shows up microscopically. However, there are characteristics typical of DAI that may or may not show up on a CT scan. Diffuse injury has more microscopic injury than macroscopic injury and is difficult to detect with CT and MRI, but its presence can be inferred when small bleeds are visible in the corpus callosum or the cerebral cortex. MRI is more useful than CT for detecting characteristics of diffuse axonal injury in the subacute and chronic time frames. Newer technology, such as diffusion tensor imaging, is able to demonstrate the degree of white matter fiber tract injury even when the standard MRI is negative. Since axonal damage in DAI is largely a result of secondary biochemical cascades, it has a delayed onset, so a person with DAI who initially appears well may deteriorate later. Thus, injury is frequently more severe than is realized, and medical professionals should suspect DAI in any patients whose CT scans appear normal but who have symptoms like unconsciousness.

MRI is more sensitive than CT scans, but is still liable to false negatives because DAI is identified by looking for signs of edema, which may not always be present.

DAI is classified into grades based on the severity of the injury. In Grade I, widespread axonal damage is present, but no focal abnormalities are seen. In Grade II, damage found in Grade I is present in addition to focal abnormalities, especially in the corpus callosum. Grade III damage encompasses both Grades I and II plus rostral brain stem injury and often tears in the tissue.

== Treatment ==
There is no treatment that reverses the primary axonal shearing once it has occurred; management is therefore primarily supportive and follows neurocritical-care principles used for moderate-to-severe traumatic brain injury, with the goal of preventing secondary brain injury from hypoxia, hypotension and intracranial hypertension.

Severe diffuse axonal injury may require intensive care with airway protection and mechanical ventilation when indicated to reduce secondary injury. Although diffuse axonal injury often lacks a surgically remediable mass lesion, raised intracranial pressure can occur and may warrant monitoring and treatment in selected patients.

== History ==
The idea of DAI first came about as a result of studies by Sabina Strich on lesions of the white matter of individuals who had sustained head trauma years before. Strich first proposed the idea in 1956, calling it diffuse degeneration of white matter; however, the more concise term "diffuse axonal injury" came to be preferred. Strich was researching the relationship between dementia and head trauma and asserted in 1956 that DAI played an integral role in the eventual development of dementia due to head trauma. The term DAI was introduced in the early 1980s.

== Notable examples ==
- Top Gear presenter Richard Hammond sustained a DAI as a result of the Vampire dragster crash in 2006.
- Champ Car World Series driver Roberto Guerrero suffered a DAI as a result of a crash during testing at the Indianapolis Motor Speedway in 1987.
- Formula 1 driver Jules Bianchi suffered a DAI as a result of an accident at the 2014 Japanese Grand Prix and died without regaining consciousness 9 months later.
- Actor and audiobook narrator Frank Muller, who read Stephen King's The Dark Tower, suffered a DAI in 2001 due to a motorcycle accident. He died in 2008.
- NASCAR driver Adam Petty, grandson of seven time Cup Series champion Richard Petty, sustained a diffuse axonal injury secondary to a fatal basilar skull fracture in May 2000 at New Hampshire Motor Speedway during practice for the upcoming race.

== See also ==
- Brain injury
- Axoplasmic transport
