= Complications of traumatic brain injury =

Possible consequences of a brain injury

Traumatic brain injury (TBI, physical trauma to the brain) can cause a variety of complications, health effects that are not TBI themselves but that result from it. The risk of complications increases with the severity of the trauma; however even mild traumatic brain injury can result in disabilities that interfere with social interactions, employment, and everyday living. TBI can cause a variety of problems including physical, cognitive, emotional, and behavioral complications.

Symptoms that may occur after a concussion – a minor form of traumatic brain injury – are referred to as post-concussion syndrome.

== Effects on unconsciousness ==
Generally, there are six abnormal states of consciousness that can result from a TBI:

- Stupor is a state of partial or near complete unconsciousness in which the patient is lethargic, immobile, and has a reduced response to stimuli.
- Coma is a state in which the patient is totally unconscious and cannot be aroused even with strong stimuli.
- Persistent vegetative state is a condition in which awake patients are unconscious and unaware of their surroundings and the cerebral cortex is not functioning. A vegetative state can result from diffuse injury to the cerebral hemispheres of the brain without damage to the lower brain and brainstem. The vegetative state is considered permanent if it persists for 12 months after TBI or 3 months after causes other than trauma.
- A minimally conscious state is a condition in which patients have a reduced level of arousal and may appear, on the surface, to be in a persistent vegetative state but are capable of demonstrating the ability to actively process information.
- Locked-in syndrome is a condition in which a patient is aware and awake, but cannot move or communicate due to complete paralysis of the body. Voluntary control of eye movements or blinking may be spared, permitting the detection of conscious awareness and enabling the establishment of functional communication.
- Brain death is the irreversible loss of measurable brain function, with loss of any integrated activity among distinct areas of the brain. Breathing and heart function must be maintained with assistive devices.

Disorders of consciousness affect a significant number of people with severe TBI; of those with severe TBI discharged from a hospital, 10%-15% are in a vegetative state, and of this number only half regain consciousness within one to three years.

== Cognitive deficits ==
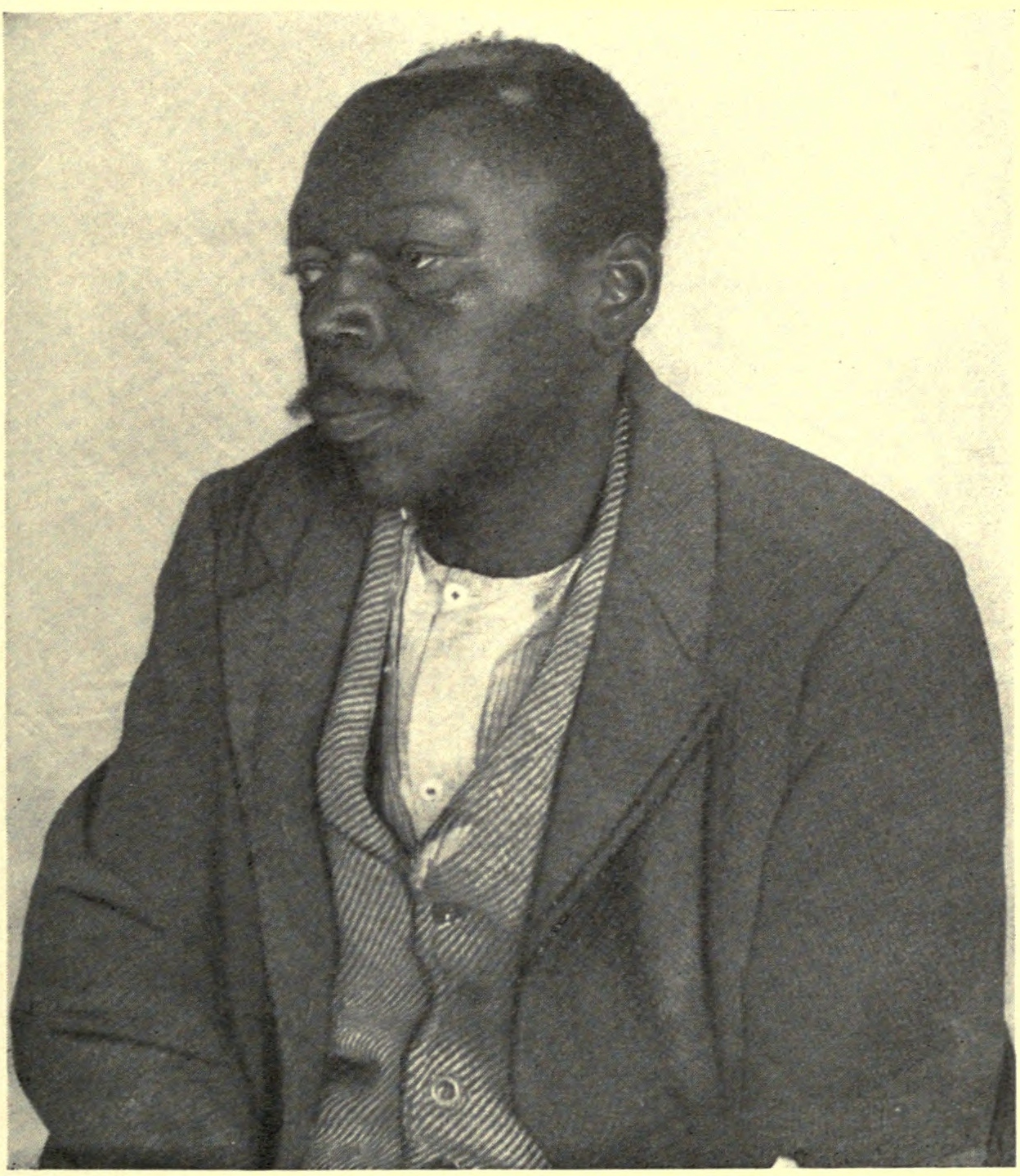
Traumatic brain injury, hit by an engine. Patient briefly had mania and epilepsy followed by dementia; portion of frontal and parietal bone removed.

Most patients with severe TBI who recover consciousness experience cognitive disabilities, including the loss of many higher-level mental skills. Cognitive deficits that can follow TBI include impaired attention; disrupted insight, judgement, and thought; reduced processing speed; distractibility; and deficits in executive functions such as abstract reasoning, planning, problem-solving, and multitasking. Memory loss, the most common cognitive impairment among head-injured people, occurs in 20–79% of people with closed head trauma, depending on severity. Post-traumatic amnesia (PTA), a confusional state with impaired memory, is characterized by loss of specific memories or the partial inability to form or store new ones.

Alzheimer's disease (AD) is a progressive, neurodegenerative disease characterized by dementia, memory loss, and deteriorating cognitive abilities. Research suggests an association between head injury in early adulthood and the development of AD later in life; the more severe the head injury, the greater the risk of developing AD. Some evidence indicates that a head injury may interact with other factors to trigger the disease and may hasten the onset of the disease in individuals already at risk. For example, head-injured people who have a particular form of the protein apolipoprotein E (apoE4, a naturally occurring protein that helps transport cholesterol through the bloodstream) fall into this increased risk category.

Patients with moderate to severe TBI have more problems with cognitive deficits than do those with mild TBI, but several mild TBIs may have an additive effect. About one in five career boxers is affected by chronic traumatic brain injury (CTBI), which causes cognitive, behavioral, and physical impairments. Dementia pugilistica, also called chronic traumatic encephalopathy, is the severe form of CTBI. Caused by repetitive blows to the head over a long period, the condition primarily affects career boxers and has recently been linked to other contact sports including American football and ice hockey as well as military service (see Ann McKee). It commonly manifests as dementia, or declining mental ability, memory problems, and parkinsonism (tremors and lack of coordination). Symptoms begin anywhere between 6 and 40 years after the start of a boxing career, with an average onset of about 16 years.

== Communication problems ==
Language and communication problems are common disabilities in TBI patients. Some may experience aphasia, difficulty with understanding and producing spoken and written language; or they may have difficulty with the more subtle aspects of communication, such as body language and emotional, non-verbal signals. Some may have problems with intonation or inflection, called prosodic dysfunction. Problems with spoken language may occur if the part of the brain that controls speech muscles is damaged. In this disorder, called dysarthria, the patient can think of the appropriate language, but cannot easily speak the words because they are unable to use the muscles needed to form the words and produce the sounds. Speech is often slow, slurred, and garbled.

== Sensory deficits ==
TBI patients may have sensory problems, especially problems with vision; they may not be able to register what they are seeing or may be slow to recognize objects. Also, TBI patients often have difficulty with hand–eye coordination, causing them to seem clumsy or unsteady. Other sensory deficits include problems with hearing, smell, taste, or touch. Tinnitus, a ringing or roaring in the ears, may occur. A person with damage to the part of the brain that processes taste or smell may perceive a persistent bitter taste or noxious smell. Damage to the part of the brain that controls the sense of touch may cause a TBI patient to develop persistent skin tingling, itching, or pain. These conditions are rare and difficult to treat.

== Emotional and behavioral problems ==
TBI may cause emotional or behavioral problems and changes in personality. Emotional symptoms that can follow TBI include emotional instability, depression, anxiety, hypomania, mania, apathy, irritability, and anger. TBI appears to predispose a person to psychiatric disorders including obsessive compulsive disorder, alcohol or substance abuse or substance dependence, dysthymia, clinical depression, bipolar disorder, phobias, panic disorder, and schizophrenia. About one quarter of people with TBI develop clinical depression, and about 9% experience mania. The prevalence of all psychiatric illnesses is 49% in moderate to severe TBI and 34% in mild TBI within a year of injury, compared with 18% of controls. People with TBI continue to be at greater risk for psychiatric problems than others even years after an injury. Problems that may persist for up to two years after the injury include irritability, suicidal ideation, insomnia, and loss of the ability to experience pleasure from previously enjoyable experiences.

Behavioral symptoms that can follow TBI include disinhibition, inability to control anger, impulsiveness, lack of initiative, inappropriate sexual activity, and changes in personality. Different behavioral problems are characteristic of the location of injury; for instance, frontal lobe injuries often result in disinhibition and inappropriate or childish behavior, and temporal lobe injuries often cause irritability and aggression.

== Physical complications ==
The relative risk of post-traumatic seizures increases with the severity of traumatic brain injury.

Pain, especially headache, is a common complication following a TBI. Being unconscious and lying still for long periods can cause blood clots to form (deep venous thrombosis), which can cause pulmonary embolism. Other serious complications for patients who are unconscious, in a coma, or in a vegetative state include pressure sores, pneumonia or other infections, and progressive multiple organ failure.

The risk of post-traumatic seizures increases with severity of trauma (image at right) and is particularly elevated with certain types of brain trauma such as cerebral contusions or hematomas. As many as 50% of people with penetrating head injuries will develop seizures. People with early seizures, those occurring within a week of injury, have an increased risk of post-traumatic epilepsy (recurrent seizures occurring more than a week after the initial trauma) though seizures can appear a decade or more after the initial injury and the common seizure type may also change over time. Generally, medical professionals use anticonvulsant medications to treat seizures in TBI patients within the first week of injury only and after that only if the seizures persist.

Coagulopathy after a TBI can appear, due to specific biochemical processes, which can in turn lead to further serious complications, such as progressive hemorrhagic injury.

Neurostorms may occur after a severe TBI. The lower the Glasgow Coma Score (GCS), the higher the chance of Neurostorming. Neurostorms occur when the patient's Autonomic Nervous System (ANS), Central Nervous System (CNS), Sympathetic Nervous System (SNS), and Parasympathetic nervous system (PSNS) become severely compromised. This in turn can create the following potential life-threatening symptoms: increased intra-cranial pressure (ICP), tachycardia, tremors, seizures, fevers, increased blood pressure, increased Cerebral Spinal Fluid (CSF), and diaphoresis. A variety of medication may be used to help decrease or control neurostorm episodes.

Parkinson's disease and other motor problems as a result of TBI are rare but can occur. Parkinson's disease, a chronic and progressive disorder, may develop years after TBI as a result of damage to the basal ganglia. Other movement disorders that may develop after TBI include tremor, ataxia (uncoordinated muscle movements), and myoclonus (shock-like contractions of muscles).

Skull fractures can tear the meninges, the membranes that cover the brain, leading to cerebrospinal fluid leaks (CSF leaks). A tear between the dura and the arachnoid membranes, called a CSF fistula, can cause CSF to leak out of the subarachnoid space into the subdural space; this is called a subdural hygroma. CSF can also leak from the nose and the ear. These tears can also allow bacteria into the cavity, potentially causing infections such as meningitis. Pneumocephalus occurs when air enters the intracranial cavity and becomes trapped in the subarachnoid space. Infections within the intracranial cavity are a dangerous complication of TBI. They may occur outside of the dura mater, below the dura, below the arachnoid (meningitis), or within the brain itself (abscess). Most of these injuries develop within a few weeks of the initial trauma and result from skull fractures or penetrating injuries. Standard treatment involves antibiotics and sometimes surgery to remove the infected tissue.

Injuries to the base of the skull can damage nerves that emerge directly from the brain (cranial nerves). Cranial nerve damage may result in:

- Paralysis of facial muscles
- Damage to the nerves responsible for eye movements, which can cause double vision
- Damage to the nerves that provide sense of smell
- Loss of vision
- Loss of facial sensation
- Swallowing problems

Hydrocephalus, post-traumatic ventricular enlargement, occurs when CSF accumulates in the brain, resulting in dilation of the cerebral ventricles and an increase in ICP. This condition can develop during the acute stage of TBI or may not appear until later. Generally it occurs within the first year of the injury and is characterized by worsening neurological outcome, impaired consciousness, behavioral changes, ataxia (lack of coordination or balance), incontinence, or signs of elevated ICP.

Any damage to the head or brain usually results in some damage to the vascular system, which provides blood to the cells of the brain. The body can repair small blood vessels, but damage to larger ones can result in serious complications. Damage to one of the major arteries leading to the brain can cause a stroke, either through bleeding from the artery or through the formation of a blood clot at the site of injury, blocking blood flow to the brain. Blood clots also can develop in other parts of the head. Other types of vascular complications include vasospasm, in which blood vessels constrict and restrict blood flow, and the formation of aneurysms, in which the side of a blood vessel weakens and balloons out.

Fluid and hormonal imbalances can also complicate treatment. Hormonal problems can result from dysfunction of the pituitary, the thyroid, and other glands throughout the body. Two common hormonal complications of TBI are syndrome of inappropriate secretion of antidiuretic hormone and hypothyroidism.

Another common problem is spasticity. In this situation, certain muscles of the body are tight or hypertonic because they cannot fully relax.

== See also ==
- Sleeping disorders following traumatic brain injury
