= Damir Janigro =

American neuroscientist and academic

- Occupations: Neuroscientist, academic, and author

Academic background
- Education: Ph.D.

Damir Janigro is a neuroscientist, academic, and author. He is an adjunct professor at Case Western Reserve University (CWRU). His research interests have included the blood–brain barrier (BBB), epilepsy, cerebrovascular function and stroke damage, drug resistance, and the analysis of neurological disorders.

He is a fellow of the American Epilepsy Society.

== Education and career ==
In 1982, Janigro completed his Ph.D. with Dario DiFrancesco. He received his postdoctoral training with Phil Schwartzkroin. From 1987 to 1989, he worked as a research associate at the University of Milan. Later, he joined the University of Washington as a research assistant professor between 1990 and 1995. At the same institution, he also held other appointments, including research assistant professor (adjunct) from 1993 to 1995, associate professor from 1996 to 1999, and affiliate professor (honorary title) from 1999 to 2010. In 1999, he directed cerebrovascular research in the Department of Neurosurgery at the Cleveland Clinic, a position he held until 2015.

Janigro joined the Cleveland Clinic Lerner College of Medicine as a professor in 2002, a role he held until 2015. During this period, he also served as scientific director of the Arts and Medicine Institute from 2008 to 2015. Following his tenure at Cleveland Clinic, Janigro became chief scientific officer of Flocel in 2015. He also served as president of the Antonio Janigro Foundation. In 2016, he founded FloTBI and has since acted as its chief scientific officer. Since 2017, he has also been an adjunct professor at Case Western Reserve University.

== Research ==
Janigro's research has focused on the physiology and pathology of the blood-brain barrier (BBB) and its role in neurological disorders. He has examined how BBB dysfunction contributes to disease processes, particularly in epilepsy. He has contributed to the development of in vitro BBB models, including dynamic, flow-based in vitro systems that simulate cerebrovascular function, which have been used to study neurovascular interactions, drug permeability, and drug transport. Additionally, he has studied how music and sound patterns influence brain activity and reduce stress during neurosurgical procedures. He has also examined ultrasound effects in a laboratory system simulating blood vessels, enabling earlier diagnosis of traumatic brain injury. His group, in a study led by Nicola Marchi, reported seizures in patients undergoing osmotic BBB opening, with evidence linking BBB disruption to seizure onset. For this work, Marchi received the Morris-Coole Prize.

Janigro's research has also involved studies on biomarkers of brain injury and BBB disruption. His studies have explored proteins such as S100B as blood-based markers of concussion and traumatic brain injury following BBB disruption. He found that S100B levels rise with the number of head impacts in athletes, supporting its potential as an objective blood-based marker for concussion. He has shown that elevated serum S100B levels are associated with BBB dysfunction and S100B in the bloodstream triggers antibodies that cross a damaged BBB, contributing to epilepsy and dementia. In addition to biomarker studies, his work has addressed broader mechanisms of neurological disease, including neuroinflammation, drug resistance, and epileptogenesis. His research has investigated how inflammatory processes and metabolic disorders influence seizure activity as well as how transport mechanisms at the BBB affect drug delivery to the brain.

== Books ==
Janigro has published Speed Trap, a novel, and has translated a novel written by the Croatian writer Milutin Cihlar Nehajev titled Fugue: A Tale of One of Us. He has also authored Antonio Janigro: A Gentleman of the Cello, a biography of his father, Antonio Janigro. Later, this book was also translated into Italian.

== Awards and honors ==
- Fellow – American Epilepsy Society

== Bibliography ==
=== Books ===
- Janigro, Damir (2008). The Cell Cycle in the Central Nervous System. Springer Science & Business Media. ISBN 9781597450218.
- Janigro, Damir (2009). Mammalian Brain Development. Humana Press. ISBN 9781607612872.
- Janigro, Damir; Nehlig, Astrid; Marchi, Nicola (2021). Inflammation and Epilepsy: New Vistas. Springer Nature. ISBN 9783030674038.
- Janigro, Damir (2024). Speed Trap. Damir Janigro. ISBN 9798328418430.
- Janigro, Damir (2024). Antonio Janigro: A Gentleman of the Cello. Damir Janigro. ISBN 9798335009263.

=== Selected articles ===
- Dombrowski, Stephen M.; Desai, Shailesh Y.; Marroni, Matteo; Cucullo, Luca; et al. (2001). "Overexpression of Multiple Drug Resistance Genes in Endothelial Cells from Patients with Refractory Epilepsy". Epilepsia. 42 (12): 1501–1506. doi:10.1046/j.1528-1157.2001.12301.x. PMID 11879359.
- Marchi, Nicola; Angelov, Lilyana; Masaryk, Thomas; Fazio, Vincent; et al. (2007). "Seizure-Promoting Effect of Blood–Brain Barrier Disruption". Epilepsia. 48 (4): 732–742. doi:10.1111/j.1528-1167.2007.00988.x. PMC 4135474. PMID 17319915.
- Neuwelt, Edward A.; Bauer, Björn; Fahlke, Christoph; Fricker, Gert; Iadecola, Constantino; et al. (2011). "Engaging Neuroscience to Advance Translational Research in Brain Barrier Biology". Nature Reviews Neuroscience. 12 (3): 169–182. doi:10.1038/nrn2995. PMC 3335275. PMID 21331083.
- Cucullo, Luca; Hossain, Mohammed; Puvenna, Vikram; Marchi, Nicola; Janigro, Damir (2011). "The Role of Shear Stress in Blood-Brain Barrier Endothelial Physiology". BMC Neuroscience. 12 (1) 40. doi:10.1186/1471-2202-12-40. PMC 3103473. PMID 21569296.
- Abbott, N. Joan; Pizzo, Michelle E.; Preston, Jane E.; Janigro, Damir; Thorne, Robert G. (2018). "The Role of Brain Barriers in Fluid Movement in the CNS: Is There a 'Glymphatic' System?". Acta Neuropathologica. 135 (3): 387–407. doi:10.1007/s00401-018-1812-4. PMID 29428972.
