= Post-traumatic =

Post-traumatic refers to conditions following a physical trauma, i.e. an injury or damage caused by physical harm, or a psychological trauma:

- Post-concussion syndrome
- Post-traumatic abortion syndrome
- Post-traumatic amnesia
- Post-traumatic embitterment syndrome
- Post-traumatic epilepsy
- Post-traumatic growth
- Post-traumatic punctate intraepidermal hemorrhage
- Post-traumatic seizure
- Post-traumatic stress disorder
  - Complex post-traumatic stress disorder

== Other uses ==
- Post Traumatic, an album by Mike Shinoda, 2018
- Post Traumatic (EP), by Mike Shinoda, 2018
- Post Traumatic (Tee Grizzley album) or the title song, 2024
- Post-Traumatic, a 2022 novel by Chantal V. Johnson

== See also ==
- Post Traumatic Slave Syndrome
