= Long-term video-EEG monitoring =

Long-term video-electroencephalography (EEG) monitoring is a diagnostic technique commonly used in patients with epilepsy. It involves the long-term hospitalization of the patient, typically for days or weeks, during which brain waves are recorded via EEG and physical actions are continuously monitored by video. In epileptic patients, this technique is typically used to capture brain activity during seizures. The information gathered can be used for initial prognosis or long-term care management.

== History ==
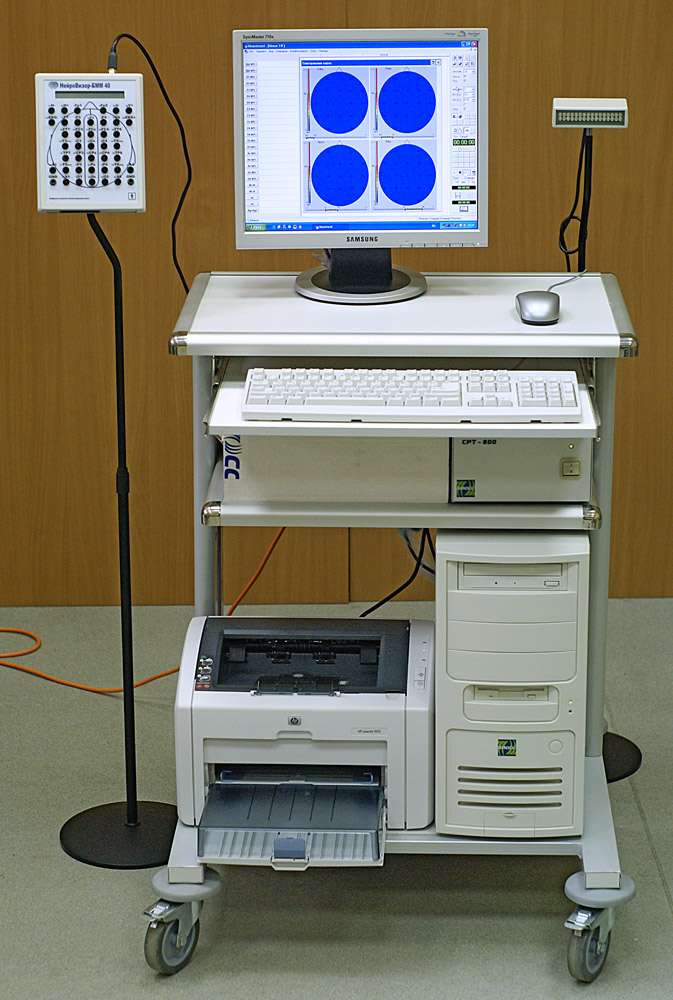
Electroencephalograph machine (left) with computer monitor (center) for display and photic device for stimulation.

Like standard EEG-testing, long-term video-EEG monitoring techniques developed from techniques in 1875 by Richard Caton in Liverpool. In 1890, his work was expanded upon by Adolf Beck as developments to the technique were enhanced through animal studies of rhythmic oscillations in the brain due to light stimuli. In these studies, electrodes were placed directly on the surface of the brain. Additional developments made using animal subjects persisted through the early 1900s including the work of Vladimir Vladimirovich Pravdich-Neminsky in 1912, Napoleon Cybulski and Jelenska-Macieszyna in 1914, as well as by Hans Berger in 1924 with the first human EEG recording. These developments lead to the modern EEG techniques which allow for non-invasive measurements using externally placed EEG caps and were established by William Grey Walter in the 1950s. From these easy uses and techniques, a longer-term method of EEG monitoring was developed called long-term video-EEG monitoring which applies these same brain-wave monitoring techniques in a long-duration test format. This test format allows at-home or extended monitoring in clinics and hospitals where the standard EEG monitoring was previously unable to be used.

In either case, these EEG measuring techniques allow one to non-invasively measure action potentials of groups of neurons within the brain using transducers called electrodes. The electrical signals from these electrode transducers are then amplified using differential amplifiers to measure potential differences from one area of the scalp or brain to another. The acquired analog signal is then converted to a digital signal to allow processing and storage of the data using an analog-to-digital converter which is then filtered to remove any signal noise not associated with the neuronal activity. The final signal can then be displayed on an external computer screen as a visual representation of the EEG signals measured. Other EEG techniques can sum these cellular responses either temporally or spatially and help determine which areas of the brain are active during specific activities or due to specific stimuli.

== Medical Uses ==
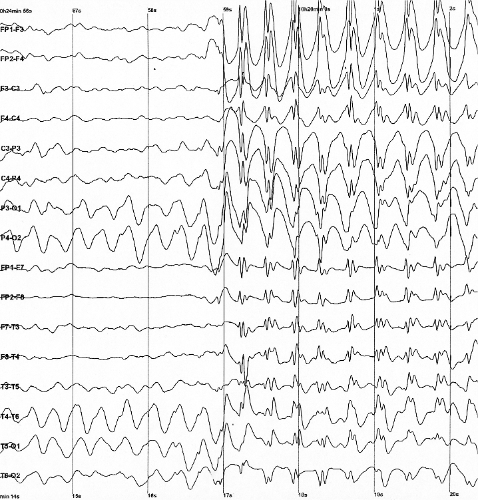
Epileptic EEG output collected from a child with childhood absence epilepsy.

Long-term video-EEG monitoring is utilized in the localization of epileptogenic zones which are the areas of the cortex of the brain responsible for epileptic seizures. Long-term video-EEG monitoring is similar to EEG in that the brain waves are periodically monitored and analyzed by a neurologist, typically one trained in clinical neurophysiology. The neurologist determines when the monitoring is finished and issues the final report after the compiled data is interpreted.

The results from the EEG and video monitoring are used to characterize episodic disruptions in brain function and its physical manifestations; many recordings show symptoms of epileptic seizures over time and how severe/frequent the seizures become over a given period of time.

The purposes of long-term video-EEG monitoring include discovering where in the brain seizures begin for a given patient, the severity of the seizures (measured according to a scaled order), determining the frequency of the seizures, the duration and prominence of physical activity during the seizure (which may be indicator of status epilepticus, prolonged seizures or increased frequency of seizures without a return to an otherwise normal state), and distinguishing epileptic seizures from psychogenic non-epileptic seizures. Additionally, audio recordings of patients (verbal and nonverbal) may be taken of the subject during those seizures. Each of these topics may then be used to evaluate a subject's candidacy for surgery to treat epilepsy.

In adults, long-term EEG monitoring typically involves one of three procedures which include long-term video-EEG monitoring, sleep-deprived EEG monitoring, and 24-hour ambulatory monitoring. Long-term video-EEG monitoring typically lasts from a few hours to several days. Depending on the needs of the patient where sleep-deprived and ambulatory EEG monitoring are often used to further investigate symptoms of epilepsy when a standard EEG reading returns inconclusive results. Furthermore, sometimes all three procedures of long-term EEG monitoring are utilized for a single patient due to niche results found in each. Video-EEG (LTVER) specializes in recording of seizures for topographic diagnosis as well as for diagnosis of paroxysmal clinical events. Sleep-deprived EEG monitoring diagnoses specific EEG abnormalities for syndromic classification. Lastly, Ambulatory EEG focuses on monitoring/ quantification of EEG abnormalities.

Long-term video-EEG monitoring is typically used in cases of drug-resistant epilepsy to examine symptoms before surgery and is also used to more precisely diagnose a patient when episodes become more frequent.

== Risks/Complications ==
In order to perform long-term video-EEG monitoring appropriately, a patient is admitted into a hospital or clinic, where epileptic seizures may be induced using sleep deprivation techniques or temporarily ceasing the patient's use of antiepileptic drugs. With these techniques, the patient under observation is susceptible to not only experiencing a higher frequency of seizures, but to a change in seizure type or seizure intensity. These changes in seizure behavior can in turn lead to the patient experiencing a higher risk of injuries due to uncontrolled mental behavior such as aggression, psychosis, self-inflicted injury, as well as seizure-related injuries including falls and status epilepticus. Finally, other safety concerns of patients under observation using long-term video-EEG monitoring include technical problems with the equipment used such as electrode degradation and restraints. Each of these safety concerns are negated with staff training and education.

In human use for diagnostic purposes, long-term video-EEG monitoring is a relatively safe procedure compared to other invasive brain-monitoring techniques. However, despite long-term video-EEG monitoring being a generally non-invasive procedure, there still exists the potential for adverse events to occur. These adverse events can mostly prevented with proper test administration. Should an adverse event occur, increased time of hospitalization or death are not likely.

== Society and Culture ==
As seizures have become more easily monitored by neurologists, as well as patients, EEGs and long-term video-EEGs have become the standard for both hospital and home-care. The data and information logs of these EEGs provide insight to a patient's condition that may be otherwise improperly recorded or noticed and can allow for a sense of security and control for the individual/caregiver. The use of long-term EEG thus allows for full episodic events to be recorded so as to give semiological clues that are needed to define the epileptogenic zone in the brain where these events are occurring.

At-home long-term video-EEG monitoring reduces the financial burden, since the individual is no longer at a hospital, or place of care, for long periods of time, as well as allowing for possible epileptic triggers to remain. For example, how an individual has habits at their home, the feeling of their bed when sleeping, or stress levels at home may influence the onset of an episode. Remaining at home will keep the patient under the conditions they would normally be under, when experiencing a seizure. In contrast, long-term video-EEG monitoring may record non-cerebral signals from throughout the body such as biological and extra-physiological artifacts and thus makes the data logs susceptible to displaying false positives that can result in false seizure reports. These false data reports may then impede the neurologist from distinguishing where an episode may begin and end, or if an episode occurred at all. The use of at-home devices also introduces obstacles such as daily visits by a professional to collect the data logs and to take care of the equipment, equipment hazards, and lighting issues for the video recording device. Having long-term video-EEG monitoring sessions in a clinical setting provides a controlled environment that allows the health professional to most efficiently collect data, monitor seizure inducing procedures, and keep the equipment functioning properly.

== Research ==
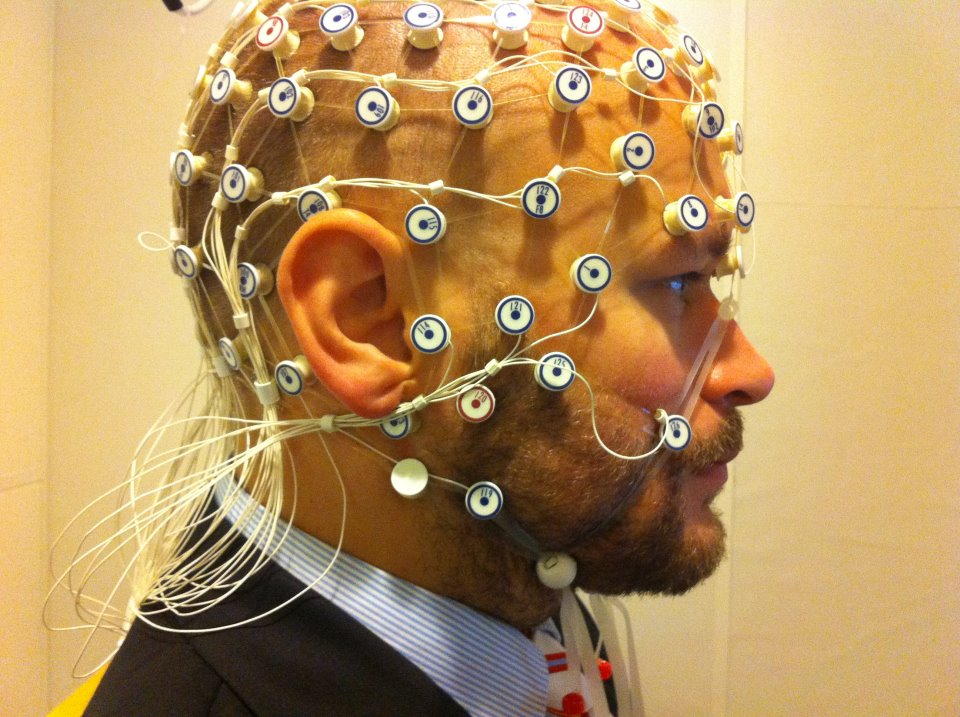
EEG cap setup.

Research involving the use of long-term video-EEG monitoring has mostly involved animal models which allows for neuronal activity to be better understood by using methods that may involve the use of psychoactive drugs or inducing states that would not be ethical to induce in humans experimentally. These models provide a relatively inexpensive and low risk scenario compared to humans, when testing their effects on the brain in response to events such as pre-clinical and clinical use of pharmaceutical drugs. The use of animal models also allows for variables, that are not as easily related to seizures in humans, to be taken into account such as how status epileptici affect their brain over an individual's life span, familial lineage, and development during maturation. Thus the heritability, prevalence, and general development of seizures over many generations can be closely monitored and studied.

Current research being performed using long-term video-EEG monitoring mostly focuses on the mouse model known as C57BL/6J which can be used to induce behavioral convulsive (CS) and electrographic-nonconvulsive (NCS) seizures. These seizures can then be monitored over a 4-18 week period, which is a much longer period than most humans are normally comfortable with. As these mice are monitored, factors such as the length of the episode, spike amplitude, interspike interval, and spike frequency can all be closely observed to see how CS and NCS develop over the trial. The stages of the status epileptici can then be distinguished by using scales, such as the Racine Stages and CSS indices, to determine the severity of the episode and how they may also change over a given cycle.
