= Post-traumatic epilepsy =

- Specialty: Neurology

Post-traumatic epilepsy (PTE) is a form of acquired epilepsy that results from brain damage caused by physical trauma to the brain (traumatic brain injury, abbreviated TBI). A person with PTE experiences repeated post-traumatic seizures (PTS, seizures that result from TBI) more than a week after the initial injury. PTE is estimated to constitute 5% of all cases of epilepsy and over 20% of cases of acquired epilepsy (in which seizures are caused by an identifiable organic brain condition).

It is not known who will develop epilepsy after TBI and who will not. However, the likelihood that a person will develop PTE is influenced by the severity and type of injury; for example penetrating injuries and those that involve bleeding within the brain confer a higher risk. The onset of PTE can occur within a short time of the physical trauma that causes it, or months or years after. People with head trauma may remain at a higher risk for post-traumatic seizures than the general population even decades after the injury. PTE may be caused by several biochemical processes that occur in the brain after trauma, including overexcitation of brain cells and damage to brain tissues by free radicals.

Diagnostic measures include electroencephalography (EEG) and brain imaging techniques such as magnetic resonance imaging, but these are not totally reliable. Antiepileptic drugs do not prevent the development of PTE after head injury, but may be used to treat the condition if it does occur. When medication does not work to control the seizures, surgery may be needed. Modern surgical techniques for PTE have their roots in the 19th century, but trepanation (cutting the skull to make a hole) may have been used for the condition in ancient cultures.

== Classification ==
Seizures may occur after traumatic brain injury; these are known as post-traumatic seizures (PTS). However, not everyone who has post-traumatic seizures will continue to have post-traumatic epilepsy, because the latter is a chronic condition. However, the terms PTS and PTE are used interchangeably in medical literature. Seizures due to post-traumatic epilepsy are differentiated from non-epileptic post-traumatic seizures based on their cause and timing after the trauma. A person with PTE has late seizures, those occurring more than a week after the initial trauma. Late seizures are considered to be unprovoked, while early seizures (those occurring within a week of trauma) are thought to result from direct effects of the injury. A provoked seizure is one that results from an exceptional, nonrecurring cause such as the immediate effects of trauma rather than a defect in the brain; it is not an indication of epilepsy. Thus for a diagnosis of PTE, seizures must be unprovoked.

Disagreement exists about whether to define PTE as the occurrence of one or more late, unprovoked seizures, or whether the condition should only be diagnosed in people with two or more. Medical sources usually consider PTE to be present if even one unprovoked seizure occurs, but more recently it has become accepted to restrict the definition of all types of epilepsy to include only conditions in which more than one occur. Requiring more than one seizure for a diagnosis of PTE is more in line with the modern definition of epilepsy, but it eliminates people for whom seizures are controlled by medication after the first seizure.

As with other forms of epilepsy, seizure types in PTE may be partial (affecting only part of one hemisphere of the brain) or generalized (affecting both hemispheres and associated with loss of consciousness). In about a third of cases, people with PTE have partial seizures; these may be simple or complex. In simple partial seizures, level of consciousness is not altered, while in complex partial seizures consciousness is impaired. When generalized seizures occur, they may start out as partial seizures and then spread to become generalized.

== Causes ==
Cumulative incidence after 30 years of PTE in head injured individuals

It is not clear why some patients develop PTE while others with very similar injuries do not. However, possible risk factors have been identified, including severity and type of injury, presence of early seizures, and genetic factors.

=== Genetics ===
Genetics may play a role in the risk that a person will develop PTE; people with the ApoE-ε4 allele may be at higher risk for PTE. The haptoglobin Hp2-2 allele may be another genetic risk factor, possibly because it binds hemoglobin poorly and thus allows more iron to escape and damage tissues. However, most studies have found that having family members with epilepsy does not significantly increase the risk of PTS, suggesting that genetics are not a strong risk factor.

=== Severity of trauma ===
The more severe the brain trauma is, the more likely a person is to have late PTE. Evidence suggests that mild head injuries do not confer an increased risk of developing PTE, while more severe types do. In simple mild TBI, the risk for PTE is about 1.5 times that of the uninjured population. By some estimates, as many as half of individuals with severe brain trauma experience PTE; other estimates place the risk at 5% for all TBI patients and 15–20% for severe TBI. One study found that the 30-year risk of developing PTE was 2.1% for mild TBI, 4.2% for moderate, and 16.7% for severe injuries, as shown in the chart at right.

=== Nature of trauma ===
The nature of the head trauma also influences the risk of PTE. People who have depressed skull fractures, penetrating head trauma, early PTS, and intracerebral and subdural haematomas due to the TBI are especially likely to have PTE, which occurs in more than 30% of people with any one of these findings. About 50% of patients with penetrating head trauma develop PTE, and missile injuries and loss of brain volume are associated with an especially high likelihood of developing the condition. Injuries that occur in military settings carry higher-than-usual risk for PTE, probably because they more commonly involve penetrating brain injury and brain damage over a more widespread area. Intracranial hematomas, in which blood accumulates inside the skull, are one of the most important risk factors for PTE. Subdural hematoma confers a higher risk of PTE than does epidural hematoma, possibly because it causes more damage to brain tissue. Repeated intracranial surgery confers a high risk for late PTE, possibly because people who need more surgery are more likely to have factors associated with worse brain trauma such as large hematomas or cerebral swelling. In addition, the chances of developing PTE differ by the location of the brain lesion: brain contusion that occurs on in one or the other of the frontal lobes has been found to carry a 20% PTE risk, while a contusion in one of the parietal lobes carries a 19% risk and one in a temporal lobe carries a 16% chance. When contusions occur in both hemispheres, the risk is 26% for the frontal lobes, 66% for the parietal, and 31% for the temporal.

=== Post-traumatic seizures ===
The risk that a person will develop PTE is heightened but not 100% if PTS occur. Because many of the risk factors for both PTE and early PTS are the same, it is unknown whether the occurrence of PTS is a risk factor in and of itself. However, even independent of other common risk factors, early PTS have been found to increase the risk of PTE to over 25% in most studies. A person who has one late seizure is at even greater risk for having another than one who has early PTS; epilepsy occurs in 80% of people who have a late seizure. Status epilepticus, a continuous seizure or multiple seizures in rapid succession, is especially strongly correlated with the development of PTE; status seizures occur in 6% of all TBIs but are associated with PTE 42% of the time, and quickly halting a status seizure reduces chances of PTE development.

== Pathophysiology ==
For unknown reasons, trauma can cause changes in the brain that lead to epilepsy. There are a number of proposed mechanisms by which TBI causes PTE, more than one of which may be present in a given person. In the period between a brain injury and onset of epilepsy, brain cells may form new synapses and axons, undergo apoptosis or necrosis, and experience altered gene expression. In addition, damage to particularly vulnerable areas of the cortex such as the hippocampus may give rise to PTE.

Blood that gathers in the brain after an injury may damage brain tissue and thereby cause epilepsy. Products that result from the breakdown of hemoglobin from blood may be toxic to brain tissue. The "iron hypothesis" holds that PTE is due to damage by oxygen free radicals, the formation of which is catalyzed by iron from blood. Animal experiments using rats have shown that epileptic seizures can be produced by injecting iron into the brain. Iron catalyzes the formation of hydroxyl radicals by the Haber–Weiss reaction; such free radicals damage brain cells by peroxidizing lipids in their membranes. The iron from blood also reduces the activity of an enzyme called nitric oxide synthase, another factor thought to contribute to PTE.

After TBI, abnormalities exist in the release of neurotransmitters, chemicals used by brain cells to communicate with each other; these abnormalities may play a role in the development of PTE. TBI may lead to the excessive release of glutamate and other excitatory neurotransmitters (those that stimulate brain cells and increase the likelihood that they will fire). This excessive glutamate release can lead to excitotoxicity, damage to brain cells through overactivation of the biochemical receptors that bind and respond to excitatory neurotransmitters. Overactivation of glutamate receptors damages neurons; for example it leads to the formation of free radicals. Excitotoxicity is a possible factor in the development of PTE; it may lead to the formation of a chronic epileptogenic focus. An epileptic focus is the part of the brain from which epileptic discharges originate.

In addition to chemical changes in cells, structural changes that lead to epilepsy may occur in the brain. Seizures that occur shortly after TBI can reorganize neural networks and cause seizures to occur repeatedly and spontaneously later on. The kindling hypothesis suggests that new neural connections are formed in the brain and cause an increase in excitability. The word kindling is a metaphor: the way the brain's response to stimuli increases over repeated exposures is similar to the way small burning twigs can produce a large fire. This reorganization of neural networks may make them more excitable. Neurons that are in a hyperexcitable state due to trauma may create an epileptic focus in the brain that leads to seizures. In addition, an increase in neurons' excitability may accompany loss of inhibitory neurons that normally serve to reduce the likelihood that other neurons will fire; these changes may also produce PTE.

== Diagnosis ==
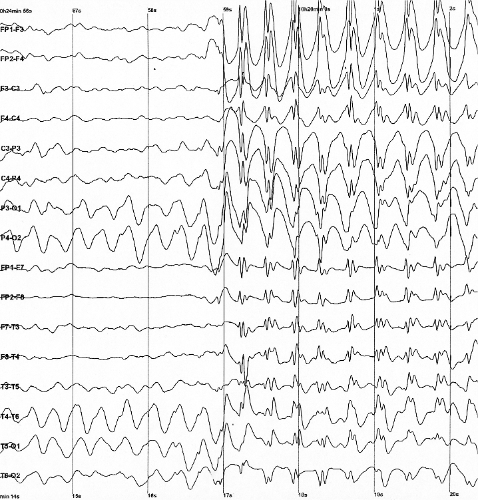
EEG shows abnormal activity in some types of seizure disorder, but may or may not display abnormal findings in PTE.

To be diagnosed with PTE, a person must have a history of head trauma and no history of seizures prior to the injury. Witnessing a seizure is the most effective way to diagnose PTE. Electroencephalography (EEG) is a tool used to diagnose a seizure disorder, but a large portion of people with PTE may not have the abnormal "epileptiform" EEG findings indicative of epilepsy. In one study, about a fifth of people who had normal EEGs three months after an injury later developed PTE. However, while EEG is not useful for predicting who will develop PTE, it can be useful to localize the epileptic focus, to determine severity, and to predict whether a person will have more seizures if they stop taking antiepileptic medications.

Magnetic resonance imaging (MRI) is performed in people with PTE, and CT scanning can be used to detect brain lesions if MRI is unavailable. However, it is frequently not possible to detect the epileptic focus using neuroimaging.

For a diagnosis of PTE, seizures must not be attributable to another obvious cause. Seizures that occur after head injury are not necessarily due to epilepsy or even to the head trauma. Like anyone else, TBI survivors may have seizures due to factors including imbalances of fluid or electrolytes, epilepsy from other causes, hypoxia (insufficient oxygen), and ischemia (insufficient blood flow to the brain). Withdrawal from alcohol is another potential cause of seizures. Thus these factors must be ruled out as causes of seizures in people with head injury before a diagnosis of PTE can be made.

== Prevention ==
Prevention of PTE involves preventing brain trauma in general; protective measures include bicycle helmets and child safety seats. No specific treatment exists to prevent the development of epilepsy after TBI occurs. In the past, antiepileptic drugs were used with the intent of preventing the development of PTE. However, while antiepileptic drugs can prevent early PTS, clinical studies have failed to show that prophylactic use of antiepileptic drugs prevents the development of PTE. Why antiepileptic drugs in clinical trials have failed to stop PTE from developing is not clear, but several explanations have been offered. The drugs may simply not be capable of preventing epilepsy, or the drug trials may have been set up in a way that did not allow a benefit of the drugs to be found (e.g. drugs may have been given too late or in inadequate doses). Animal studies have similarly failed to show much protective effect of the most commonly used seizure medications in PTE trials, such as phenytoin and carbamazepine. Antiepileptic drugs are recommended to prevent late seizures only for people in whom PTE has already been diagnosed, not as a preventative measure. On the basis of the aforementioned studies, no treatment is widely accepted to prevent the development of epilepsy. However, it has been proposed that a narrow window of about one hour after TBI may exist during which administration of antiepileptics could prevent epileptogenesis (the development of epilepsy). There is no evidence to support or went against the usage of antiepileptic drugs for prophylaxis of late PTE.

Corticosteroids have also been investigated for the prevention of PTE, but clinical trials revealed that the drugs did not reduce late PTS and were actually linked to an increase in the number of early PTS.

== Treatment ==
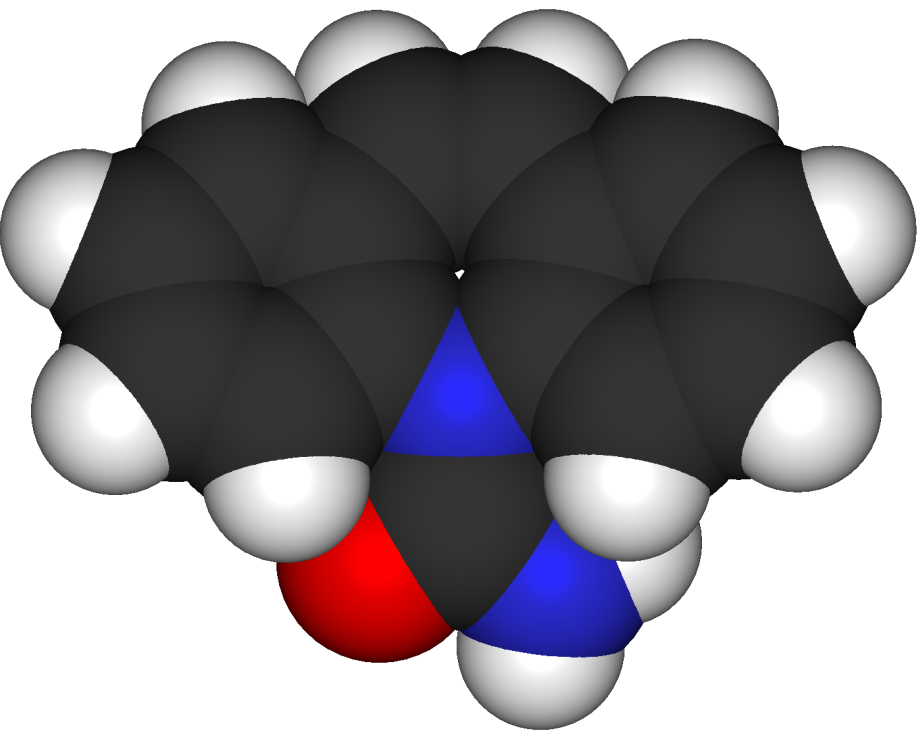
Carbamazepine, commonly used to treat PTE

Antiepileptic drugs may be given to prevent further seizures; these drugs eliminate seizures for about 35% of people with PTE. However, antiepileptics only prevent seizures while they are being taken; they do not reduce the occurrence once the patient stops taking the drugs. Medication may be stopped after seizures have been controlled for two years. PTE is commonly difficult to treat with drug therapy, and antiepileptic drugs may be associated with side effects. The antiepileptics carbamazepine and valproate are the most common drugs used to treat PTE; phenytoin may also be used but may increase risk of cognitive side effects such as impaired thinking. Other drugs commonly used to treat PTE include clonazepam, phenobarbitol, primidone, gabapentin, and ethosuximide. Among antiepileptic drugs tested for seizure prevention after TBI (phenytoin, valproic acid, carbamazepine, phenobarbital), no evidence from randomized controlled trials has shown superiority of one over another.

People whose PTE does not respond to medication may undergo surgery to remove the epileptogenic focus, the part of the brain that is causing the seizures. However surgery for PTE may be more difficult than it is for epilepsy due to other causes, and is less likely to be helpful in PTE than in other forms of epilepsy. It can be particularly difficult in PTE to localize the epileptic focus, in part because TBI may affect diffuse areas of the brain. Difficulty locating the seizure focus is seen as a deterrent to surgery. However, for people with sclerosis in the mesial temporal lobe (in the inner aspect of the temporal lobe), who comprise about one third of people with intractable PTE, surgery is likely to have good outcome. When there are multiple epileptic foci or the focus cannot be localized, and drug therapy is not effective, vagus nerve stimulation is another option for treating PTE.

People with PTE have follow-up visits, in which health care providers monitor neurological and neuropsychological function and assess the efficacy and side effects of medications. As with other types of epilepsy, individuals with PTE are advised to exercise caution when performing activities for which seizures could be particularly risky, such as rock climbing.

== Prognosis ==
The prognosis for epilepsy due to trauma is worse than that for epilepsy of undetermined cause. People with PTE are thought to have shorter life expectancies than people with brain injury who do not have seizures. Compared to people with similar structural brain injuries but without PTE, people with PTE take longer to recover from the injury, have more cognitive and motor problems, and perform worse at everyday tasks. This finding may suggest that PTE is an indicator of a more severe brain injury, rather than a complication that itself worsens outcome. PTE has also been found to be associated with worse social and functional outcomes but not to worsen patients' rehabilitation or ability to return to work. However, people with PTE may have trouble finding employment if they admit to having seizures, especially if their work involves operating heavy machinery.

The period of time between an injury and development of epilepsy varies, and it is not uncommon for an injury to be followed by a latent period with no recurrent seizures. The longer a person goes without developing seizures, the lower the chances are that epilepsy will develop. At least 80–90% of people with PTE have their first seizure within two years of the TBI. People with no seizures within three years of the injury have only a 5% chance of developing epilepsy. However, one study found that head trauma survivors are at an increased risk for PTE as many as 10 years after moderate TBI and over 20 years after severe TBI. Since head trauma is fairly common and epilepsy can occur late after the injury, it can be difficult to determine whether a case of epilepsy resulted from head trauma in the past or whether the trauma was incidental.

The question of how long a person with PTE remains at higher risk for seizures than the general population is controversial. About half of PTE cases go into remission, but cases that occur later may have a smaller chance of doing so.

== Epidemiology ==
Studies have found that the incidence of PTE ranges between 1.9 and more than 30% of those with TBI, varying by severity of injury and by the amount of time after TBI for which the studies followed subjects.

Brain trauma is one of the strongest predisposing factors for epilepsy development, and is an especially important factor in young adults. Young adults, who are at the highest risk for head injury, also have the highest rate of PTE, which is the largest cause of new-onset epilepsy cases in young people. Children have a lower risk for developing epilepsy; 10% of children with severe TBI and 16–20% of similarly injured adults develop PTE. Being older than 65 is also a predictive factor in the development of epilepsy after brain trauma. One study found PTE to be more common in male TBI survivors than in females.

== History ==
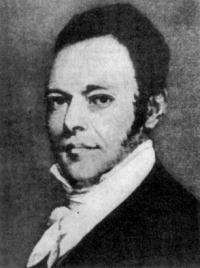
Benjamin Winslow Dudley performed trepanation for PTE before antisepsis was available.

Records of PTE exist from as early as 3000 BC. Trepanation, in which a hole is cut in the skull, may have been used to treat PTE in ancient cultures. In the early 19th century, the surgeons Baron Larrey and WC Wells each reported having performed the operation for PTE. The French-educated American surgeon Benjamin Winslow Dudley (1785–1870) performed six trepanations for PTE between the years of 1819 and 1832 in Kentucky and had good results despite the unavailability of antisepsis. The surgery involved opening the skull at the site of injury, debriding injured tissue, and sometimes draining blood or fluid from under the dura mater. Dudley's work was the largest series of its kind that had been done up to that point, and it encouraged other surgeons to use trepanation for post-traumatic seizures. His reports on the operations came before it was accepted that surgery to relieve excess pressure within the skull was effective in treating epilepsy, but it helped set the stage for trepanation for PTE to become common practice. The procedure became more accepted in the late 19th century once antisepsis was available and cerebral localization was a familiar concept. However, in 1890, the prominent German physician Ernest von Bergmann criticized the procedure; he questioned its efficacy (except in particular circumstances) and suggested that operations had been declared successful too soon after the procedures to know whether they would confer a long-term benefit. The late 19th century saw the advent of intracranial surgery, operating on brain lesions believed to be causing seizures, a step beyond cranial surgery which involved just the skull and meninges. By 1893, at least 42 intracranial operations had been performed for PTE in the US, with limited success.

Surgery was the standard treatment for PTE until the years following World War II, when the condition received more attention as soldiers who had survived head trauma developed it. The increased need for drugs to treat PTE led to trials with antiepileptics; these early trials suggested that the drugs could prevent epileptogenesis (the development of epilepsy). It was still thought that antiepileptic drugs could prevent epileptogeneis in the 1970s; in 1973, 60% of physicians surveyed used them to prevent PTE. However, the clinical trials which had supported a protective effect of antiepileptics were uncontrolled; in later, controlled trials the drugs failed to demonstrate an antiepileptogenic effect. Studies did show that antiepileptics prevented seizures occurring within a week after injury, and in 1995 the task force of the Brain Trauma Foundation published a recommendation suggesting their use to protect against seizures early after trauma. However, recommendations were published against the prophylactic use of antiepileptic drugs more than a week after injury by the Brain Injury Special Interest group of the American Academy of Physical Medicine and Rehabilitation in 1998 and by the American Association of Neurological Surgeons in 2000.

== Research ==
How epilepsy develops after an injury to the brain is not fully understood, and gaining such understanding may help researchers find ways to prevent it, or make it less severe or easier to treat. Researchers hope to identify biomarkers, biological indications that epileptogenesis is occurring, as a means to find drugs that can target pathways by which epilepsy develops. For example, drugs could be developed to interfere with secondary brain injury (injury that does not occur at the moment of trauma but results from processes initiated by it), by blocking pathways such as free radical damage to brain tissue. An increase in understanding of age differences in epilepsy development after trauma may also help researchers find biomarkers of epileptogenesis. There is also interest in finding more antiepileptic drugs, with the potential to interfere with epileptogenesis. Some new antiepileptic drugs such as topiramate, gabapentin, and lamotrigine have already been developed and have shown promise in treatment of PTE. No animal model has all the characteristics of epileptogenesis in humans, so research efforts aim to identify one. Such a model may help researchers find new treatments and identify the processes involved in epileptogenesis. However, the most common mechanical models of traumatic brain injury such as fluid percussion injury, controlled cortical impact, and weight-drop injury models exhibit epileptogenesis at chronic time points with documented remote electroencephalographic and behavioral seizures, and increased seizure susceptibility. It has been reported that PTE can also occur in zebrafish, resulting in similar pathophysiological responses to human TBI.

== See also ==
- Complications of traumatic brain injury
