= Post-Traumatic =

2022 American novel

- First edition
- Author: Chantal V. Johnson
- Language: English
- Publisher: Little, Brown and Company
- Publication date: 2022
- ISBN: 978-0-316-26423-5 (first edition, hardcover)
- LC Class: PS3610.O32387 P67

Post-Traumatic is an American novel first published in 2022 by Little, Brown and Company. It is the debut novel of author Chantal V. Johnson, and was longlisted for the Center for Fiction’s First Novel Prize. The novel follows an outwardly successful lawyer working at a psychiatric hospital who struggles with hypervigilance and intrusive thoughts after a violent childhood. Johnson wrote the novel while working full time as a lawyer. Upon its release, the book received mostly positive reviews.

== Plot ==
Vivian is a woman in her thirties who lives in New York City and works as a lawyer advocating for institutionalized mentally ill patients. In private, Vivian struggles with the psychological aftermath of familial violence, which manifests in fears that she will be assaulted and many other symptoms associated with Complex-PTSD.

Levity in the novel is achieved through Vivian's darkly comic inner monologue and the character's relationship with her best friend Jane, a black academic with whom she smokes weed and riffs back and forth.

After a disturbing family reunion, Vivian decides to estrange from her relatives, going no-contact with them. Her decision is met with skepticism by her friends, contributing to her growing emotional instability. Following a public outburst at a wedding and a wellness check initiated by her family, Vivian decides to seek therapy.

In therapy Vivian begins to work through her traumatic past. She reunites with Jane and starts writing fiction.

== Reception ==
Vulture called Johnson's writing "witty and maximalist" and compared Johnson to Sylvia Plath, writing, “Like The Bell Jar, Post-Traumatic reveals sociopolitical rot by way of one woman’s crack-up.” Publishers Weekly called it "A brutally funny and poignant debut" and gave the book a starred review, whereas Kirkus generally complimented the thoughtfulness and opening, but critiqued it as occasionally verbose. The New York Times described the book as an "emotionally complex debut". The Book Riot podcast called the novel "a seminal work…the Catcher in the Rye of our moment."

The Nation wrote: "Post-Traumatic is the deepest literary dive yet into the psychology of the messy Black girl, and perhaps the most complex due to its granular representation of the somatic effects of trauma." Writing for Boston Review, Anna Krauthamer similarly praised the novel's psychological depth as well as its framing of trauma as a structural and social phenomenon, rather than a merely individual and medical one:

Post-Traumatic diverges from how classical trauma theory privileges the “event.” It suggests that the novel can capture traumatic experience—by looking back to the scattered, systemic causes behind it at the same time as it looks forward to its effects. Such a framing aligns more closely with Lauren Berlant’s attention to the “mere banality” that characterizes, for many, living through structural violence. Berlant describes living “in proximity to a suffused violence so systemic... it is a relief when an event expresses it.” Post-Traumatic similarly reflects recent calls to shift the framing of mental health crises from “medicalized” frameworks to structural ones.

Ultimately, "Post-Traumatic resists the literary tendency to reduce traumatic experience to a well-defined story… For a novel that wears its relationship to trauma on its sleeve, its relationship to that word is always a question posed."
