= Sleeping disorders following traumatic brain injury =

Sleep disorders as common repercussions of traumatic brain injury

Sleep disorder is a common repercussion of traumatic brain injury (TBI). It occurs in 30%-70% of patients with TBI. TBI can be distinguished into two categories, primary and secondary damage. Primary damage includes injuries of white matter, focal contusion, cerebral edema and hematomas, mostly occurring at the moment of the trauma. Secondary damage involves the damage of neurotransmitter release, inflammatory responses, mitochondrial dysfunctions and gene activation, occurring minutes to days following the trauma. Patients with sleeping disorders following TBI specifically develop insomnia, sleep apnea, narcolepsy, periodic limb movement disorder and hypersomnia. Furthermore, circadian sleep-wake disorders can occur after TBI.

== Presentation ==
=== Consequences ===
Increased level of anxiety and depression is associated with higher levels of sleep disturbances in TBI patients. If depression or anxiety are not treated in these patients, successful treatment of sleep may be prevented. TBI patients with sleepiness show impaired cognitive function and vigilance performance which impairs daily functioning. Sleep is known for its neuroprotective role by elimination of neurotoxic waste products, the neural growth and plasticity, but furthermore, for a specific neuroplastic recovery effect from post mild TBI symptoms. Therefore, sleep disturbance may have a negative effect on injury recovery, rehabilitation and outcomes, leading to long term disabilities. This may be related to less non-REM sleep due to a higher amount of stage 1 sleep. TBI patients with obstructive sleep apnea show reduced cardiac function and hypertension. Obstructive sleep apnea is also associated with structural changes in the brain.

Indirect consequences of sleep disorders after TBI can be the exacerbation of the many complications and comorbidities of TBI. These include fatigue, post-traumatic stress symptoms or post-traumatic stress disorder (PTSD) and chronic pain.

Animal studies with rodents showed that sleep deprivation after traumatic brain injury has been associated with multiple, potentially negative effects on brain homeostasis, including changes in glutamate concentration and energy consumption as well as in brain temperature.

In summary, sleep disorders occurring in TBI patients are associated with a low health-related quality of life and a shorter survival status.

== Causes ==
There are different kinds of TBI that cause different brain dysfunctions. Research suggests that TBI results in damage to sleep-regulation centers including the reticular activation system, specifically damage to the suprachiasmatic nuclei (SCN) which leads to disturbances in the circadian rhythm. Considering hypersomnia, mostly areas involving the maintenance of wakefulness are damaged, such as the rostral pons, caudal midbrain and thalamus.

Sleep disorders are more frequently reported when patients have mild TBI (mTBI). Reasons for that could be the increased awareness of postinjury changes in mild TBI patients because they may be more determined to return to their preinjury life situation. All age groups can be affected from sleep disorders after TBI, including children and adolescents.

There are several risk factors that are associated with occurring sleep disorders, such as lower years of education, severity of head injury and occurrence of residuals symptoms, for example headache or dizziness.

Further neurodegeneration such as impaired neurotransmitter function, cerebrovascular autoregulatory dysfunction, neuroinflammation and dysregulation of circadian hormones such as melatonin and adenosine can also be a consequence leading to sleep disturbances.

== Treatment ==
In order to make a diagnosis, a subjective evaluation and objective sleep tests are assessed. Subjective evaluations include self-report questionnaires and sleep diaries to assess the sleep pattern from the patient's perspective. Objective sleep tests include mental and physical examinations and laboratory tests to test the medical background, such as Polysomnography (PSG) and Actigraphy. It is typically not possible to assess these tests prior to an injury. Therefore, it is often not clear whether the sleeping disorder is a result of pre-existing disorders. Careful assessment of patients and determining the nature of their sleeping disorder is essential for finding the most effective treatment. It is also important to ensure that measures of sleep are appropriate for use in the stroke population. McLaren et al. validated the Sleep Condition Indicator - a brief self-report measure of insomnia - for use after stroke, and found the optimal diagnostic cut-off to be lower after stroke (≤13) than is conventional in the general population (≤16).

There is no explicit treatment for sleep disorders following TBI. Several interventions for general sleep disturbance have been tested in patients with TBI. In order to provide the proper treatment, it is best to divide the injury and its recovery in stages, given that the treatments differs in the different stages. It has been seen how a deterioration of sleep quality during the subacute phase of mTBI has been linked with the worsening of behavioural, neuropsychiatric and somatic outcomes. In general, treatment of sleep disorders following TBI can be distinguished in pharmacological and nonpharmacological interventions.

=== Pharmacological treatments ===
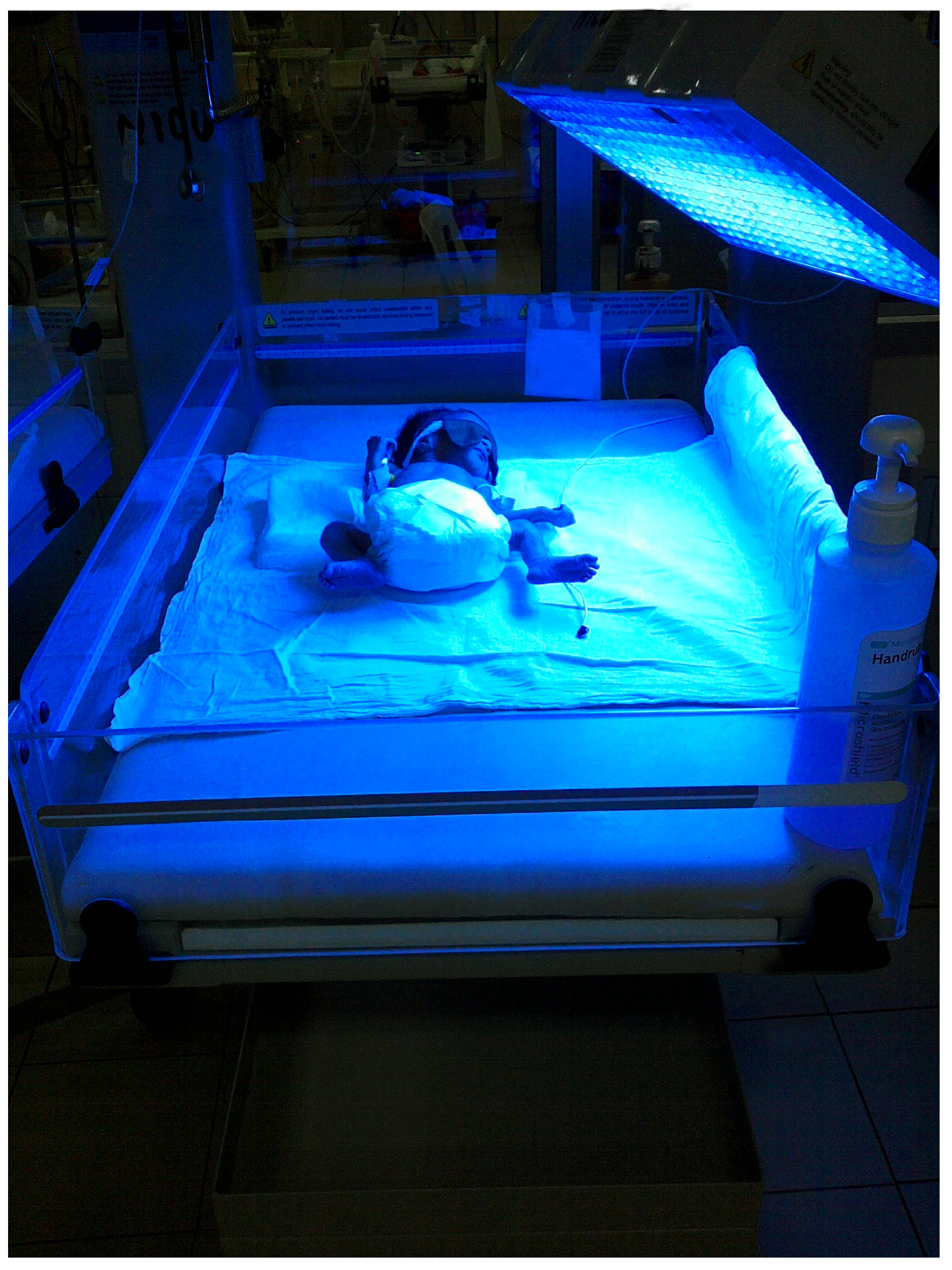
Phototherapy

Pharmacological treatments have to be administered carefully. Some medication is highly addictive and the resulting withdrawal syndromes cause even more sleep disturbances, e.g. Insomnia. Possible medications are Zopiclone and lorazepam, which have been proven effective in people with TBI. Also Benzodiazepine hypnotics, Benzodiazepine-receptor antagonists, antidepressants, psychostimulants can be administered, especially in patients with insomnia. Some studies have shown negative effects of hypnotics, such as an increased risk of dementia. In patients with hypersomnia, Modafinil, Armodafinil, Methylphenidate and amphetamines are often used as a treatment for day time sleepiness. Medication should always be prescribed by an expert to make sure that the correct medicament is taken in an appropriate dose.

=== Nonpharmacological treatments ===
Nonpharmacological treatments involve different interventions, starting with sleep hygiene, which includes sleep promoting activities such as maintaining a regular and strict sleep schedule and avoiding heavy meals before bedtime in order to restore the natural sleep-wake cycle. Further treatments options are phototherapy and infrared light therapy, which both, aim to treat circadian rhythm disorders such as delayed sleep phase disorder. Especially in patients with hypersomnia, bright light therapy in the morning has been proven to be effective. A prolongation of slow-wave sleep increases glymphatic clearance of metabolic waste products, which can lead to improvements of sleep disorders. Furthermore, studies showed ameliorated sleep pattern due to acupuncture of patients with TBI. Sleep apnea due to TBI can be treated through positive airway pressure, which helps with the development of a regular breathing pattern during sleep and prevents waking up. Cognitive behavioral therapy for insomnia also have been shown to effectively improve sleep in TBI patients. It aims to improve sleep habits and behaviors by identifying and changing the thoughts and the behaviors that affect the ability of a person to sleep or sleep well. The improvement of the quality of sleep and the decrease of depressive severity is associated with he use of near-infrared light for intracellular healing.

=== Animal studies ===
Animals studies showed that sleep deprivation prior to a brain injury might have healthy effects. Five days of complete sleep deprivation in rats before the traumatic brain injury, acted as protection against ischemic injury and a habitual deceased in total amount of sleep time before TBI reduced the severity.

There are several theories on the protectional effects of sleep disturbances before an injury in rats. Firstly, it may alter the pattern of gene activation and deactivation. This could lead to a higher degree of neuroprotection. Lack of sleep might increase the levels of extracellular adenosine, which is also mostly neuroprotective against the TBI sequelae. Furthermore, sleep deprivation might lead to a form of "ischemic precondition" which habituates the brain to the byproducts of a cellular injury. Studies have been run to assess the role of caffeine in rats with sleeping disorders. While results regarding rats studies have come out positive, in humans caffeine is believed to worsen sleep fragmentation and insomnia. Lastly insufficient quantity and quality of sleep may cause a rebound sleep post injury and increase the sleep enhanced regeneration and recovery. More research is needed to investigate how these findings can be transferred to the treatment of humans with TBI.
