= Epileptogenesis =

Gradual development of epilepsy in the brain

Epileptogenesis refers to the gradual process through which a previously non-epileptic brain undergoes pathological changes that ultimately lead to the development of epilepsy. Epilepsy is a chronic neurological condition characterized by an enduring predisposition to generate epileptic seizures, which are episodes of abnormal, hypersynchronous neuronal firing.

It encompasses the transformation of neuronal networks following an initial insult, such as trauma, infection, or prolonged seizures, resulting in a brain capable of generating spontaneous recurrent seizures. This process is distinct from ictogenesis, which describes the immediate mechanisms underlying the initiation of individual seizure events. While ictogenesis accounts for seizure generation, epileptogenesis involves the long-term alterations that predispose the brain to recurrent seizures.

== Initiating events ==
Epileptogenesis is typically triggered by an initial brain insult that disrupts normal neuronal networks and initiates a cascade of molecular and cellular events leading to epilepsy. A variety of conditions have been identified as initiating events, although their occurrence does not guarantee the development of epilepsy. Common initiating events include neurodegenerative diseases, traumatic brain injury (TBI), ischemic stroke, intracerebral hemorrhage, infections of the central nervous system (such as neurocysticercosis or encephalitis), brain tumors, and status epilepticus (a prolonged seizure or a series of seizures occurring in quick succession). The likelihood that an individual will develop epilepsy following an initiating event depends on multiple factors, including the type, location, and severity of the insult, the age at which the injury occurs, and genetic predisposition. For example, severe TBI involving intracranial bleeding carries a significantly higher risk of subsequent epilepsy compared to milder forms of head trauma. Similarly, the risk of developing epilepsy following a stroke is higher in cases involving cortical involvement or hemorrhagic components.

== Stages of epileptogenesis ==
Although the specific triggers vary, the overall progression typically follows a general pattern: an initial precipitating event, followed by a seizure-free latent period characterized by active remodeling, and culminating in the emergence of spontaneous recurrent seizures. These phases, while useful for conceptualizing disease progression, often overlap and may vary depending on the type and severity of the initial injury.

=== Early pathophysiological events ===
Following an initial precipitating insult, epileptogenesis is initiated by a cascade of early pathological processes such as (a) excessive release of glutamate, leading to excitotoxic neuronal injury, (b) disruption of the blood–brain barrier, resulting in infiltration of serum proteins and immune cells, and (c) activation of neuroinflammatory pathways, particularly microglial activation and cytokine production. These early events set the foundation for progressive network remodeling and eventual epileptogenesis. Although acute symptomatic seizures are traditionally considered distinct from epilepsy, occurring in close temporal association with an acute CNS insult, emerging evidence suggests they may contribute to the epileptogenic process. These early seizures can initiate neuroinflammatory responses, disrupt the blood–brain barrier, and promote neuronal network remodeling, potentially facilitating the development of spontaneous recurrent seizures characteristic of epilepsy.

=== Latent phase ===
The latent phase of epileptogenesis refers to a clinically silent interval following the initial brain insult, during which no spontaneous seizures occur but extensive molecular, cellular, and network remodeling takes place. During this phase, pathological changes include synaptic reorganization, loss of inhibitory neurons, gliosis, neurogenesis, and altered gene expression and epigenetic modifications. Although patients are asymptomatic during the latent phase, experimental models and early clinical studies suggest that biomarkers—such as abnormal electroencephalography (EEG) patterns, molecular imaging signals, and inflammatory markers in blood—may indicate ongoing epileptogenic processes. Identifying these biomarkers is a major focus of current research, as therapeutic interventions during the latent phase could potentially prevent the onset of epilepsy.

=== Chronic phase ===
The chronic phase of epileptogenesis is marked by the emergence of spontaneous, recurrent, unprovoked seizures, defining the clinical onset of epilepsy. At this stage, the brain has undergone sufficient pathological reorganization—such as synaptic remodeling, gliosis, and network hyperexcitability—to sustain seizures without an external precipitant. Although traditionally considered the endpoint of epileptogenesis, accumulating evidence suggests that pathological changes continue during the chronic phase. Neural networks may undergo further remodeling, leading to progression in seizure frequency, severity, or drug resistance.

== Pathophysiology ==
Key mechanisms implicated in epileptogenesis include neuroinflammation, disruption of the blood-brain barrier, aberrant synaptic reorganization such as mossy fiber sprouting, neuronal death, reactive gliosis, and altered neurogenesis. Brain regions that are highly sensitive to insults and can cause epileptogenesis include temporal lobe structures such as the hippocampus, the amygdala, and the piriform cortex. Although significant advances have been made in identifying these mechanisms, the precise sequence and interplay of pathological events remain incompletely understood. Moreover, biomarkers capable of predicting the development of epilepsy after an injury are still under investigation, and no therapies have yet been proven to prevent the progression of epileptogenesis in clinical practice.

=== Glutamate receptor activation ===
Activation of glutamate receptors, including both ionotropic glutamate receptors (such as NMDA and AMPA receptors) and metabotropic glutamate receptors, is a major contributor to early epileptogenic processes. Injury-induced excessive release of glutamate results in overstimulation of these receptors, leading to excitotoxicity characterized by sustained neuronal depolarization and a sharp increase in intracellular calcium (Ca²⁺) concentrations.

Elevated intracellular Ca²⁺ levels activate signaling pathways involving kinases such as Src and Fyn, which are implicated in long-term modifications of neuronal excitability and network architecture. Persistent glutamate-mediated excitotoxicity can cause neuronal injury, cell death, and contribute to the disruption of normal synaptic balance. While excessive glutamatergic activity is prominent during the acute phase following brain injury, its role appears to diminish during the latent period of epileptogenesis, with other mechanisms, such as inflammatory and structural changes, becoming more predominant.

Additionally, epileptogenic insults induce long-lasting changes in the expression and function of neurotransmitter receptors and ion channels, contributing to network hyperexcitability. Alterations in inhibitory signaling are common, including the downregulation or subunit rearrangement of GABA A receptors, which weakens synaptic inhibition. Simultaneously, excitatory pathways are often enhanced, with upregulation and increased activation of glutamate receptors, particularly NMDA receptors, further promoting excitotoxicity and neuronal depolarization. In addition to changes in receptor subunit composition, a reduction in overall GABA levels and decreased sensitivity of GABA A receptors to the neurotransmitter have been observed, further weakening inhibitory control. Hyperexcitability also reflects an imbalance between increased glutamatergic excitation and diminished GABAergic inhibition, a characteristic feature of epileptic circuits.

=== Neuroinflammation ===
Neuroinflammation is increasingly recognized as a critical contributor to the pathophysiology of epileptogenesis. Following a variety of brain insults, innate immune mechanisms are activated within the central nervous system, involving microglia, astrocytes, neurons, and vascular cells.

Among the key molecular mediators implicated in this process are interleukin-1β (IL-1β), tumor necrosis factor (TNF), high mobility group box 1 (HMGB1), transforming growth factor-β (TGF-β), and prostaglandins. These factors alter neuronal excitability, glial function, and blood–brain barrier integrity through complex transcriptional and post-translational mechanisms. A particularly important pathway is the activation of the interleukin-1 receptor (IL-1R) and Toll-like receptor 4 (TLR4) axis. IL-1β binds to IL-1R, while HMGB1 engages TLR4, both triggering inflammatory cascades that modulate synaptic function and lower seizure threshold.

If unresolved, neuroinflammation promotes neuronal hyperexcitability, seizure propagation, neuronal death, and maladaptive synaptic plasticity, thereby contributing to the transition from an initially injured brain to a chronically epileptic state. Additionally, inflammatory mediators measurable in the blood or detected by molecular imaging are being investigated as potential diagnostic, prognostic, and predictive biomarkers of epileptogenesis and pharmacoresistant epilepsy.

=== Blood–brain barrier disruption ===
Disruption of the blood–brain barrier (BBB) is common consequence of brain insults such as stroke, traumatic brain injury, status epilepticus, brain tumors, and central nervous system infections, and represents a pivotal event in the pathogenesis of epileptogenesis. BBB disruption was shown to underlay epileptogenesis by several experimental models. Breakdown of the BBB permits the extravasation of serum proteins, immune cells, and inflammatory mediators into the brain parenchyma, contributing to neuroinflammation, oxidative stress, and ionic imbalances.

Among serum components, albumin plays a particularly important role in epileptogenesis. Upon entering the brain, albumin activates transforming growth factor-β (TGF-β) signaling pathways in astrocytes, leading to disruption of potassium and glutamate homeostasis and promoting neuronal hyperexcitability. Further studies have confirmed that TGF-β signaling activation after BBB leakage promotes excitatory synaptogenesis and structural remodeling associated with epileptogenesis. Other blood-derived factors, such as iron released from hemoglobin after hemorrhage, may also exacerbate oxidative injury and contribute to epileptogenic processes.

=== Neuronal loss and gliosis ===
Neuronal death is a prominent pathological feature in the early stages of epileptogenesis, particularly affecting inhibitory GABAergic interneurons. Additionally, loss of excitatory pyramidal neurons, especially within the hippocampus and neocortex, has been documented in both human and experimental models. The selective vulnerability and loss of interneurons disrupt inhibitory control within neural circuits, tipping the excitation–inhibition balance toward hyperexcitability. In models of temporal lobe epilepsy, neuronal loss is especially prominent in the hippocampus, including the CA1 region and the hilus of the dentate gyrus, both of which are critical for maintaining normal network stability.

Concurrent with neuronal death, reactive gliosis develops, characterized by the proliferation and activation of astrocytes and microglia. Reactive astrocytes undergo morphological and functional changes that impair potassium and glutamate buffering, alter neurotransmitter homeostasis, and release proinflammatory cytokines. Activated microglia further contribute to the pro-inflammatory environment by releasing additional inflammatory mediators and promoting neuronal injury.

Astrogliosis and microgliosis are not merely passive responses to brain injury; rather, they actively participate in circuit remodeling and the perpetuation of a hyperexcitable state. These pathological changes in glial and neuronal populations persist into the chronic phase of epilepsy and are considered central to the formation and maintenance of epileptic networks.

=== Synaptic reorganization (mossy fiber sprouting) ===
Following neuronal loss and gliosis, surviving neurons may undergo synaptic reorganization in an attempt to restore network connectivity. A prominent example of such reorganization in temporal lobe epilepsy is mossy fiber sprouting (MFS), wherein dentate granule cell axons aberrantly project into the inner molecular layer of the dentate gyrus. This aberrant growth forms recurrent excitatory circuits among granule cells, potentially contributing to network hyperexcitability and the generation of spontaneous seizures. Factors promoting mossy fiber sprouting include the loss of target neurons in the hilus and CA3, activity-dependent release of growth factors such as brain-derived neurotrophic factor (BDNF), and downregulation of axonal guidance molecules like Sema3A.

Although MFS is a frequent histopathological finding in mesial temporal lobe epilepsy and various experimental models, its precise role remains controversial. Some studies have demonstrated robust mossy fiber sprouting in the absence of spontaneous seizures, while others have shown seizure activity without evident MFS. Thus, MFS is not considered strictly necessary nor sufficient for epileptogenesis. It has been proposed that mossy fiber sprouting may initially represent a compensatory or adaptive response to injury, aimed at restoring lost synaptic contacts, but may ultimately contribute to the emergence of aberrant excitatory networks. Consequently, MFS remains an active area of investigation for its potential as a therapeutic target in epilepsy prevention and disease modification.

=== Altered neurogenesis ===
Adult neurogenesis, particularly in the subgranular zone of the dentate gyrus, plays a crucial role in maintaining hippocampal function. However, brain injury can markedly alter the rate, pattern, and integration of newborn neurons. Following epileptogenic insults such as status epilepticus, stroke, or trauma, there is often an initial increase in neurogenesis. Many of these newborn granule cells migrate abnormally and form aberrant synaptic connections, including projections into inappropriate target regions. This miswiring can contribute to the creation of hyperexcitable circuits and promote the development of spontaneous seizures. Although injury-induced neurogenesis may initially represent an attempt to repair damaged neural networks, the resulting structural abnormalities and maladaptive plasticity can ultimately facilitate epileptogenesis.

=== Epigenetic and molecular changes ===
Epileptogenic brain injuries are associated with widespread alterations in gene expression, involving both transcriptional regulation and epigenetic modifications. Mechanisms such as DNA methylation, histone acetylation, and changes in non-coding RNA profiles have been implicated in modifying neuronal excitability, synaptic plasticity, and inflammatory responses. These molecular alterations may contribute to the long-lasting structural and functional reorganization that characterizes epileptogenesis.

== Research and treatment ==
Epileptogenesis that occurs in human brains has been modeled in a variety of animal models and cell culture models. Epileptogenesis is poorly understood, and increasing understanding of the process may aid researchers in preventing seizures, diagnosing epilepsy, and developing treatments to prevent it.

A major goal of epilepsy research is the identification of therapies to interrupt or reverse epileptogenesis. Studies largely in animal models have suggested a wide variety of possible antiepileptogenic strategies although, to date, no such therapy has been demonstrated to be antiepileptogenic in clinical trials. Some anticonvulsant drugs, including levetiracetam and ethosuximide have shown promising activity in animal models. Other promising strategies are inhibition of interleukin 1β signaling by drugs such as VX-765; modulation of sphingosine 1-phosphate signaling by drugs such as fingolimod; activation of the mammalian target of rapamycin (mTOR) by drugs such as rapamycin; the hormone erythropoietin; and, paradoxically, drugs such as the α2 adrenergic receptor antagonist atipamezole and the CB1 cannabinoid antagonist SR141716A (rimonabant) with proexcitatory activity. The discovery of the role played by TGF-beta activation in epileptogenesis raised the hypothesis that blocking this signaling may prevent epileptogenesis. Losartan, a commonly used drug for the treatment of hypertension was shown to prevent epilepsy and facilitate BBB healing in animal models. Testing the potential of antiepileptogenic agents (e.g. losartan) or BBB healing drugs necessitates biomarkers for patients selection and treatment-followup. BBB disruption imaging was shown capacity in animal model to serve as a biomarker of epileptogenesis and specific EEG patterns were also shown to predict epilepsy in several models.

== History ==
Historically, research in epilepsy focused primarily on the mechanisms responsible for seizure generation (ictogenesis), rather than the processes by which a brain becomes epileptic (epileptogenesis).

Although some early investigators speculated about the "ripening" of brain tissue after trauma, most early experimental studies induced seizures acutely in normal brains and did not investigate how epilepsy develops over time. The recognition that epileptogenesis is an active biological process emerged from studies of secondary epileptogenesis, such as the mirror focus phenomenon, and was greatly advanced by the introduction of the kindling model, where repeated subthreshold stimulation progressively leads to seizure development.

Later, truly chronic epilepsy models were established, particularly by inducing status epilepticus with chemoconvulsants such as pilocarpine or kainic acid, allowing researchers to study the gradual structural and functional changes underlying epileptogenesis. These discoveries solidified the modern view of epileptogenesis as a progressive, dynamic process involving neuroinflammation, synaptic reorganization, neuronal death, and network remodeling. Today, epileptogenesis is recognized as a critical target for therapeutic intervention, with ongoing research focusing on identifying biomarkers and developing preventive treatments.

== See also ==
- Kindling model
- Post-traumatic epilepsy
- Post-traumatic seizure
