= Subdural hygroma =

Collection of cerebrospinal fluid (CSF), without blood, located under the dural membrane

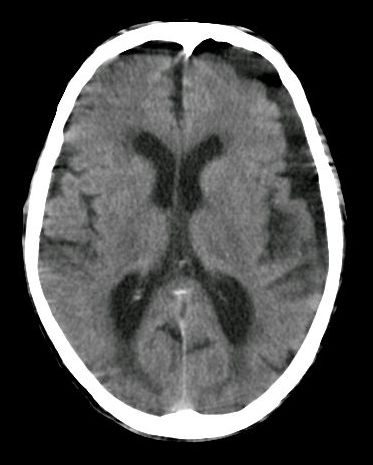
- Subdural hygroma, frontal and temporal. Man of 80 years old.
- Specialty: Neurology

A subdural hygroma (SDG) is a collection of cerebrospinal fluid (CSF), without blood, located under the dural membrane of the brain. Most subdural hygromas are believed to be derived from chronic subdural hematomas. They are commonly seen in elderly people after minor trauma, but can also be seen in children following infection or trauma. One of the common causes of subdural hygroma is a sudden decrease in pressure as a result of placing a ventricular shunt. This can lead to leakage of CSF into the subdural space especially in cases with moderate to severe brain atrophy. In these cases, symptoms such as mild fever, headache, drowsiness and confusion can be seen, which can be relieved by draining this subdural fluid.

== Etiology and Pathophysiology ==
Subdural hygromas require two conditions in order to occur. First, there must be a separation in the layers of the Meninges of the brain. Second, the resulting subdural space that occurs from the separation of layers must remain uncompressed in order for CSF to accumulate in the subdural space, resulting in the hygroma. The arachnoid mater is torn and cerebrospinal fluid (CSF) from the subarachnoid space accumulates in the subdural space. Hygromas also push the subarachnoid vessels away from the inner table of the skull. Subdural hygroma can appear in the first day, but the mean time of appearance is 9 days on CT scan. Subdural hygroma does not have internal membranes that can easily rupture like subdural haematoma, but hygroma can sometimes occur together with hemorrhage to become hematohygroma.

Subdural hygromas most commonly occur when events such as head trauma, infections, or cranial surgeries happen in tandem with brain atrophy, severe dehydration, prolonged spinal drainage, or any other event that causes a decrease in intracranial pressure. This provides the basis for why subdural hygromas more commonly occur in infants and elderly; infants have compressible brains while elderly patients have a greater amount of space for fluid to accumulate due to brain atrophy from age.

== Signs and symptoms ==
Most subdural hygromas are small and clinically insignificant. A majority of patients with SDG will not experience symptoms. However, some commonly reported but nonspecific symptoms of SDG that have been reported include headache and nausea. Focal neurologic deficits and seizures have also been reported but are nonspecific to SDG. Larger hygromas may cause secondary localized mass effects on the adjacent brain parenchyma, enough to cause a neurologic deficit or other symptoms. Acute subdural hygromas can be a potential neurosurgical emergency, requiring decompression. Acute hygromas are typically a result of head trauma—they are a relatively common posttraumatic lesion—but can also develop following neurosurgical procedures, and have also been associated with a variety of conditions, including dehydration in the elderly, lymphoma and connective tissue diseases.

== Diagnosis ==
In CT scan, subdural hygroma will have same density as the normal CSF. Meanwhile, in MRI, subdural hygroma will have same intensity with CSF. If iodinated contrast is administered during CT scan, the hygroma will produce high density because of the contrast at 120 kVp. However, at 190 kVp, hygroma with contrast will have intermediate density.

In the majority of cases, if there has not been any acute trauma or severe neurologic symptoms, a small subdural hygroma on the head CT scan will be an incidental finding. If there is an associated localized mass effect that may explain the clinical symptoms, or concern for a potential chronic SDH that could rebleed, then an MRI, with or without neurologic consultation, may be useful.

It is not uncommon for chronic subdural hematomas (SDHs) on CT reports for scans of the head to be misinterpreted as subdural hygromas, and vice versa. Magnetic resonance imaging (MRI) should be done to differentiate a chronic SDH from a subdural hygroma, when clinically warranted. Elderly patients with marked cerebral atrophy, and secondary widened subarachnoid CSF spaces, can also cause confusion on CT. To distinguish chronic subdural hygromas from simple brain atrophy and CSF space expansion, a gadolinium-enhanced MRI can be performed. Visualization of cortical veins traversing the collection favors a widened subarachnoid space as seen in brain atrophy, whereas subdural hygromas will displace the cortex and cortical veins.

== Treatment ==
Most subdural hygromas that are asymptomatic do not require any treatment. Some might opt to perform a simple burr-holes to alleviate intracranial pressure (ICP). Occasionally a temporary drain is placed for 24-48 hours post op. In recurrent cases a craniotomy may be performed to attempt to locate the location of the CSF Leak. In certain cases a shunt can be placed for additional drainage. Great caution is used when choosing to look for the CSF leak due to them generally being difficult to spot.
