= Racine stages =

Racine stages are a categorization of rodent epileptic seizures proposed by Ronald J. Racine in 1972. Prior to Racine's research in animal epilepsy models, a quantifiable means to describe seizure intensities and their causes was not readily available. Racine's work allowed for studies among different laboratories to be compared and understood more clearly.

== Introduction ==
In the brain, electrical signals are spread by the firing of neurons which lead to a desired outcome in the body. This can be caused by a release of a neurotransmitter or the voluntary contractions of a muscle. An action potential must be met in order for the electrical signal to be created. In epileptic patients, excessive neuronal firing results in a seizure - a period of neuronal hyperactivity and synchrony. Once a seizure has occurred, damage can be seen in the area that the action potential came from. For example, if the initial action potential came from the hippocampus, damage can be seen in the surrounding neurons. While an EEG is able to determine the presence of a seizure and the intensity of the action potentials, the overall result on the body is hard to determine. In 1972, while studying the kindling seizure model in rats, Ronald J. Racine developed a method to split the severity of seizures into stages: mouth and facial movement, head nodding, forelimb clonus, rearing with forelimb clonus, and rearing and falling with forelimb clonus. In the kindling seizure model used by Racine, a brief low intensity electrical stimulus is applied to a region of the brain in order to trigger a localized focal seizure discharge (the "afterischarge"). With repeated (often daily) stimulation, the discharge spreads from the site of stimulation (and connected structures) to involve more distant structures. When the discharge spreads to areas involved in movement, then convulsions are seen (the motor seizure). Over time, the motor seizures become more severe, ultimately culminating in the development of spontaneous seizures (see Pinel's stages below). Though developed in the rat electrical kindling model, the Racine scale has been adapted for other seizure models (e.g. chemical status epilepticus) as well as other species. However, since different species, seizure models and even different brain sites within the same species can present with seizures that are drastically different from one another, it has often been more useful to create specialized seizure classification schemes for each model depending on the purpose of the study (e.g. tonic hind-limb extension in the maximal electroconvulsive shock model). Therefore, the Racine scale is typically used for rodent seizures, often of limbic origin. Since human seizures do not tend to follow the rodent pattern, the Racine scale is not used to characterize human seizures.

== Development ==
A seizure is described as large amounts of synchronized action potentials which cause the body to perform uncontrollable muscle contractions resulting in involuntary movement and an incapacity to control ones actions. This synchronized action potential must surpass a certain threshold, which is different for each patient, which then reverberates throughout the body. For patients with epilepsy, seizure occurs constantly and continue to grow in intensity. When a patient has epilepsy, they are always at risk of experiencing a seizure. However, for each patient, different environmental stimuli can cause the patient to experience a seizure. For each patient, the treatment method and the success of that treatment method is different. Henry Molaison (HM) is known for his contribution to memory studies in neuroscience. Before he lost his ability to retain long-term memories, he had debilitating seizures. HM, showed small signs of seizures while growing up. Before the age of fifteen HM's only sign of a seizure was a lull in the conversation. For a few seconds he would appear as if he was daydreaming. Some described him as absent minded for a few seconds. His first traumatic seizure happened while he was fifteen. While in the family car, HM experienced a seizure that caused his entire body to convulse. In 1969, A deep brain stimulation experiment was developed to test the fluctuations of thresholds for patients with epilepsy. In this experiment, researchers used implanted electrodes to measure the electrographic activity during the introduction of a stimulus and the resulting seizure. While this experiment was successful in showing that seizure happened at lower thresholds after repeated treatments, the overall severity of each seizure was not well recorded.

=== Rat model ===
Prior to Racine's research into epilepsy, a standardized scheme for the severity of a seizure was not known. In 1972, Ronald J. Racine sought to develop a scheme that quantified the severity of a seizure. Using animal testing (rat kindling model), Racine was able to stimulate specific parts of the brain using slight electrical impulses. He used methods of deep brain stimulation in order to ensure the targeted areas of the brain were able to reach the specific threshold to see a reaction in the rats. Rats were separated into categories of the target area, duration of stimuli, and overall intensity of stimuli. He specifically targeted the hippocampus and the amygdala of the test animals. Each rat in the model was anesthetized and special probes were placed into specific parts of the brain according to the target area. Once excited, the rats would demonstrate signs of a seizure. Racine was able to categorize the bodies' reaction to the stimuli into five different categories . He also observed that with the continuation of treatment, it was easier for the seizure to take place. These stages of increasing severity can serve as a way to quantify a seizure.

== Classical stages ==
This video demonstrates a range in the severity of seizures which all fall into the five classical stages when a stimulus that causes seizures is added to the rat model. For example, rats can be seen rearing (standing on their hind legs) and falling over, which demonstrate the fourth and fifth Racine stages.

As repeated stimulations in the kindling model continue to occur, the severity of the convulsion increases in a stereotypical pattern described by the Racine stages.

=== Racine stages ===
- Mouth and facial movement
  - Characterized by a repeated opening and closing of the mouth and facial muscle contractions.
- Head nodding
  - Uncontrollable muscle contractions in the neck cause slight to severe bobbing of the head up and down.
- Forelimb clonus
  - Involuntary movement of the forelimbs that may be bilateral, unilateral, synchronized or desynchronized.
- Rearing with forelimb clonus
  - Rearing up on the hindlimbs, often with nose pointed to the ceiling.
- Rearing and falling with forelimb clonus (generalized motor convulsions)
  - Rearing with a loss of postural control (falling). (May occur repeatedly in the classical scale but has been redefined as a separate stage in other modified scales. See Pinel below.)

As the level of stimulus increases, the resulting involuntary movement goes down the level of stages. Levels further down the Racine stages also contain symptoms of the previous stages. For example, an animal that is demonstrating the actions of a stage four seizure may also demonstrate head nodding (indicative of a level two seizure). It is known that repeated exposure to a stimuli lowers the overall threshold for a seizure. The first two stages have been seen two to four days before an increase in the severity of the seizure is seen.

== Clinical uses ==
Since its development, the use of the Racine stages has helped further the research into treating epileptic patients. Currently, Racine stages are being used in rodent models. The Racine scale is still used in laboratory settings to demonstrate the severity of seizures. While this model serves as the standard for a method to quantify the severity of a seizure, additional stages have been added to model the more severe cases. In 1978, Pinel and Rovner developed a model that added to the traditional five stages. While these stages are based on the classic five stages, the increase in severity called for 5 additional stages.

=== Pinel and Rovner additional stages ===
- Multiple stage five seizures
  - Mostly two level five seizures with additional seizures possible.
- Jumping
- Running
- Jumping and running
- Two different seizures with a partial seizure in-between
  - Two seizures which are higher than the Racine stages
  - Separated by a lower level seizure

Stages 6–10 also include the addition of symptoms seen in stages one to five.

=== Additional adaptations ===
The classic five Racine stages have been adapted many times since their designation in 1972. Depending on the changes in stimuli intensity and duration, researchers add or take away levels according to the needs of the study. While adaptations do exist to the Racine stages model, the original model has served as the backbone to the idea of creating a method for determining the intensity of a seizure. The use of the Racine stages can help further research into new solutions in epileptic treatment.
