= Subdural space =

Potential space in the outer covering of brain

- Diagrammatic representation of a section across the top of the skull, showing the membranes of the brain, etc. ("Subdural cavity" visible at left.)

- Diagrammatic transverse section of the medulla spinalis and its membranes. (Subdural cavity is colored green, labeled at bottom and top right.)

Details

Identifiers
- Latin: spatium subdurale, cavum subdurale
- MeSH: D013355
- TA98: A14.1.01.109
- TA2: 5380
- FMA: 83803

The subdural space is a potential space located at the interface between the dura mater and arachnoid mater. Under normal conditions, there is no pre-formed anatomical space between the dura and arachnoid. In pathological or traumatic states, the interface may become occupied by blood (subdural hematoma), cerebrospinal fluid (subdural hygroma), or pus (abscess), and this is then described clinically as a subdural space. When a subdural space is present, it is generally understood to reflect separation or dissection within the weak dural border cell layer rather than a naturally existing cavity between dura and arachnoid.

In the cranial cavity, the term subdural is used for collections between the dura and arachnoid over the cerebral convexities, along the falx cerebri and tentorium cerebelli, and can extend widely because there are no firm internal partitions within the subdural compartment.

In the vertebral canal, the meninges similarly delineate epidural, subdural, and subarachnoid compartments; subdural anatomy is clinically relevant in neuraxial procedures and complications such as inadvertent subdural block.

== See also ==
- Epidural space
- Subarachnoid space
- Meninges
- Subdural hematoma
