= Seizure =

Period of symptoms due to excessive or synchronous neuronal brain activity

- Other names: Epileptic fit, epileptic seizure, fit, convulsions
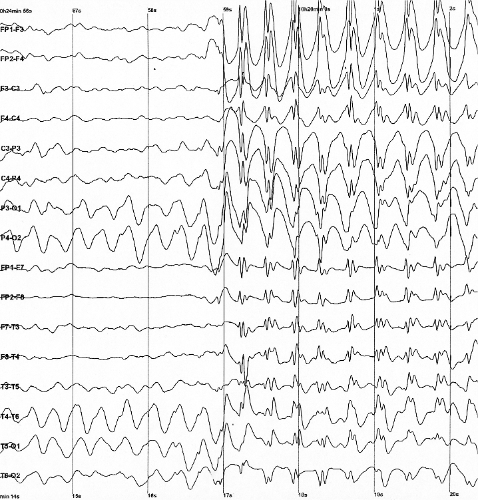
- Generalized 3 Hz spike and wave discharges in an electroencephalogram (EEG) of a patient with epilepsy
- Specialty: Neurology, emergency medicine
- Symptoms: Variable
- Complications: Falling, drowning, car accidents, pregnancy complications, emotional health issues
- Duration: Typically less than 2 minutes
- Types: Focal, generalized; provoked, unprovoked
- Causes: Provoked: Low blood sugar, alcohol withdrawal, low blood sodium, fever, brain infection, traumatic brain injury Unprovoked: Flashing lights or colors, unknown causes, previous stroke, brain injury, brain tumor
- Diagnostic method: Based on symptoms, blood tests, medical imaging, electroencephalography
- Differential diagnosis: Syncope, psychogenic seizure, migraine aura, transient ischemic attack
- Treatment: Less than 5 min: Place person on their side, remove nearby dangerous objects More than 5 min: Treat as status epilepticus
- Frequency: ≈10% of people (lifetime risk)

A seizure is a sudden disruption of brain activity caused by excessive, synchronized neuronal firing that results in changes in behavior. This neurological condition is common, affecting approximately 50 million individuals around the world.

Depending on the regions of the brain involved, seizures can lead to changes in movement, sensation, behavior, awareness, or consciousness. Symptoms vary widely. Some seizures involve subtle changes, such as brief lapses in attention or awareness (as seen in absence seizures), while others cause generalized convulsions with loss of consciousness (tonic–clonic seizures). Most seizures last less than two minutes and are followed by a postictal period of confusion, fatigue, or other symptoms. Status epilepticus is a medical emergency consisting of a seizure that lasts longer than five minutes, or multiple seizures without full recovery between episodes.

Seizures are classified as provoked when they are triggered by a known cause such as fever, acute head trauma, or metabolic imbalance. Unprovoked seizures occur when no immediate trigger is identified. Recurrent unprovoked seizures define the neurological condition epilepsy.

== Clinical features ==
The clinical signs and symptoms associated with a seizure are also referred to as seizure semiology. Seizure semiology varies depending on the brain regions involved and the type of seizure. This may affect movement, sensation, autonomic functions, or cognitive and emotional processing. Motor symptoms can include muscle stiffening (tonic activity), rhythmic jerking (clonic activity), sudden muscle jerks (myoclonus), sudden loss of muscle tone (atonia), eye deviation, or other repetitive involuntary movements (automatisms). Sensory disturbances may involve tingling, visual phenomena, or hallucinated sounds. Autonomic features can include changes in heart rate, respiration, or gastrointestinal sensations. Cognitive or emotional symptoms may manifest as confusion, fear, or altered perception.

Some individuals experience an aura associated with their focal seizures, characterized by subjective sensations such as unusual smells, a sudden emotional shift, or feelings of déjà vu.

== Classification ==
Seizures are classified according to their site of onset in the brain, clinical features, and level of consciousness during the episode. In 2025, the International League Against Epilepsy (ILAE) released an updated classification to improve clarity, clinical relevance, and global applicability. The system distinguishes four major types: focal, generalized, unknown whether focal or generalized, and unclassified seizures. Seizures are further characterized based on whether consciousness is preserved or impaired, as determined by responsiveness during the event.

=== Focal seizures ===
Focal seizures affect a specific area of the brain, not both sides. It may turn into a generalized seizure if the seizure spreads through the brain. Consciousness may or may not be impaired. The signs and symptoms of these seizures depends on the location of the brain that is affected. Focal seizures usually consist of motor symptoms or sensory symptoms.

- Sensory symptoms: Auras are subjective sensations that occur before focal seizures. Auras include changes in vision, hearing, or smell (an example is smelling rubber). Feelings of deja-vu or abdominal discomfort are also examples of auras. A person who experiences focal weakness of a limb may also have just experienced a focal seizure. This is known as Todd's paralysis.
- Motor symptoms: Head turning and eyes moving to one side, with contraction of limbs on one side is a common presentation. Automatisms are also an indicator that a seizure is focal. These are repetitive movements. It can be lip smacking, chewing, swallowing, eyelid fluttering, feet shuffling, or picking movements. Jacksonian March is also a motor presentation of a focal seizure, with contractions spreading from one muscle to the next on one side of the body.

Focal seizures can manifest with motor, sensory, autonomic, cognitive, or emotional symptoms, depending on the regions involved. They often present with unilateral symptoms, but bilateral symptoms may also be seen, even when a seizure is not classified as focal-to-bilateral. This is because several structures in the brain have bilateral effects in the body (e.g. primary visual cortex).

Focal impaired consciousness seizures are the most common type of seizure in individuals older than one year of age, affecting 36% of epilepsy patients overall.

=== Generalized seizures ===
Generalized seizures affect both sides of the brain and typically involve both sides of the body. They all involve a loss of consciousness and usually happen without warning. There are six main types of generalized seizures: tonic-clonic, tonic, clonic, myoclonic, absence, and atonic seizures.

- Tonic-clonic seizures, also known as Grand Mal seizures, present with continuous stiffening of the body for 10–20 seconds followed by rhythmic jerking. It may be accompanied by an increase in blood pressure, increase in heart rate, or urinary incontinence. The person may turn blue if breathing is impaired. Shoulder dislocation and tongue biting are also possible.
- Tonic seizures produce constant contractions of the muscles. The body stiffens for a prolonged period of time. The muscles most commonly affected are the neck, shoulders, hips, and trunk.
- Clonic seizures involve jerking of the muscles rhythmically.
- Myoclonic seizures involve short contractions of muscles in either a few areas of the body or through the whole body. They are not typically rhythmic.
- Absence seizures last 10–15 seconds usually. It is characterized by a sudden, brief episode where a person is unaware of what is happening and does not respond. The person stops in the middle of activity. The person often does not fall over. They may return to normal right after the seizure ends, with no postictal state. The person is usually unaware of what just happened.
- Atonic seizures involve the loss of muscle activity causing a person to drop abruptly with their muscles limp. This is called a drop attack.

These categories include several subtypes of seizures, each with their own distinctive symptoms and diagnostic criteria.

== Causes ==
Seizures have a number of causes. Seizures can be classified into provoked or unprovoked. Provoked seizures have a cause that is temporary and reversible. They are also known as Acute Symptomatic Seizures as they occur closely after the injury. Unprovoked seizures do not have a known cause or the cause is not reversible. Unprovoked seizures are typically considered epilepsy and treated as epilepsy. Of those who have a seizure, about 25% have epilepsy. Those with epilepsy may have certain triggers that they know cause seizures to occur, including emotional stress, sleep deprivation, and flickering lights.

=== Causes of provoked seizures ===
==== Metabolic ====
Dehydration can trigger epileptic seizures by changing electrolyte balances. Low blood sugar, low blood sodium, high blood sugar, high blood sodium, low blood calcium, high blood urea, and low blood magnesium levels may cause seizures.

==== Medications ====
Up to 9% of status epilepticus cases occur due to drug intoxication. Common drugs involved include antidepressants, stimulants (cocaine), and antihistamines. Withdrawal seizures commonly occur after prolonged alcohol or sedative use. In people who are at risk of developing epileptic seizures, common herbal medicines such as ephedra, ginkgo biloba and wormwood can provoke seizures.

==== Acute infections ====
Systemic infection with high fever is a common cause of seizures, especially in children. These are called febrile seizures and occur in 2–5% of children between the ages of six months and five years. Acute infection of the brain, such as encephalitis or meningitis are also causes of seizures.

==== Acute brain trauma ====
Acute stroke or brain bleed may lead to seizures. Stroke is the most common cause of seizures in the elderly population. Post-stroke seizures occur in 5-7% of those with ischemic strokes. It is higher in those who experienced brain bleeds, with 10-16% risk in those patients. Recent traumatic brain injury may also lead to seizures. 1 to 5 of every 10 people who have had traumatic brain injury have experienced at least one seizure. Seizures may occur within 7 days of the injury (early posttraumatic seizure) or after 7 days have passed (late posttraumatic seizure).

=== Causes of unprovoked seizures ===
==== Structural ====
Space-occupying lesions in the brain (abscesses, tumours) are one cause of unprovoked seizures. In people with brain tumours, the frequency of epilepsy depends on the location of the tumor in the cortical region. Abnormalities in blood vessels of the brain (Arteriovenous malformation) can also cause epilepsy. In babies and children, congenital brain abnormalities, such as lissencephaly or polymicrogyria, will also result in epilepsy. Hypoxic-ischemic encephalopathy in newborns will also predispose the newborn to epilepsy.

==== Prior brain trauma ====
Strokes, brain bleeds, and traumatic brain injury can all also lead to epilepsy if seizures re-occur. If the first seizure occurs more than 7 days following a stroke, there is a higher chance of the person developing epilepsy. Post-stroke epilepsy accounts for 30%-50% of new epilepsy cases. This is also the case for traumatic brain injury, with 80% of people with late posttraumatic seizures having another seizure occur, classifying it as epilepsy.

==== Prior brain infections ====
Infections of newborns that occur while before or during birth, such as herpes simplex virus, rubella, and cytomegalovirus, all carry a risk of causing epilepsy. Infection with the pork tapeworm, which can cause neurocysticercosis, is the cause of up to half of epilepsy cases in areas of the world where the parasite is common. Meningitis and encephalitis also carry the risk of causing long-term epilepsy as well.

==== Genetic epilepsy syndromes ====
During childhood, well-defined epilepsy syndromes are generally seen. Examples include Dravet syndrome, Lennox–Gastaut syndrome, and juvenile myoclonic epilepsy.

== Mechanism ==
Neurons function by either being excited or inhibited. Excited neurons fire electrical charges while inhibited neurons are prevented from firing. The balance of the two maintains our central nervous system. In those with seizures, neurons are both hyperexcitable and hypersynchronous, where many neurons fire numerously at the same time. This may be due to an imbalance of excitation and inhibition of neurons.

γ-aminobutyric acid (GABA) and Glutamate are chemicals called neurotransmitters that work by opening or closing ion channels on neurons to cause inhibition or excitability. GABA serves to inhibit neurons from firing. It has been found to be decreased in epilepsy patients. This may explain the lack of inhibition of neurons resulting in seizures. Glutamate serves to excite neurons into firing when appropriate. It was found to be increased in those with epilepsy. This is a possible mechanism for why there is hyper-excitability of neurons in seizures.

Seizures that occur after brain injury may be due to the brain adapting to injury (neuroplasticity). This process is known as epileptogenesis. There is loss of inhibitory neurons because they die due to the injury. The brain may also adapt and make new neuron connections that may be hyper-excitatory.

Brief seizures, such as absence seizures lasting 5–10 seconds, do not cause observable brain damage. More prolonged seizures have a higher risk of neuronal death. Prolonged and recurrent seizures, such as status epilepticus, typically cause brain damage. Scarring of brain tissue (gliosis), neuronal death, and shrinking of areas of the brain (atrophy) are linked to recurrent seizures. These changes may lead to the development of epilepsy, in a process called epileptogenesis.

== Diagnosis ==
The 2017 ILAE classification of seizure types and the epilepsies (click to read full text)

Diagnosis of seizures involve gathering history, doing a physical exam, and ordering tests. These are done to classify the seizure and determine if the seizure is provoked or unprovoked.

=== History and physical examination ===
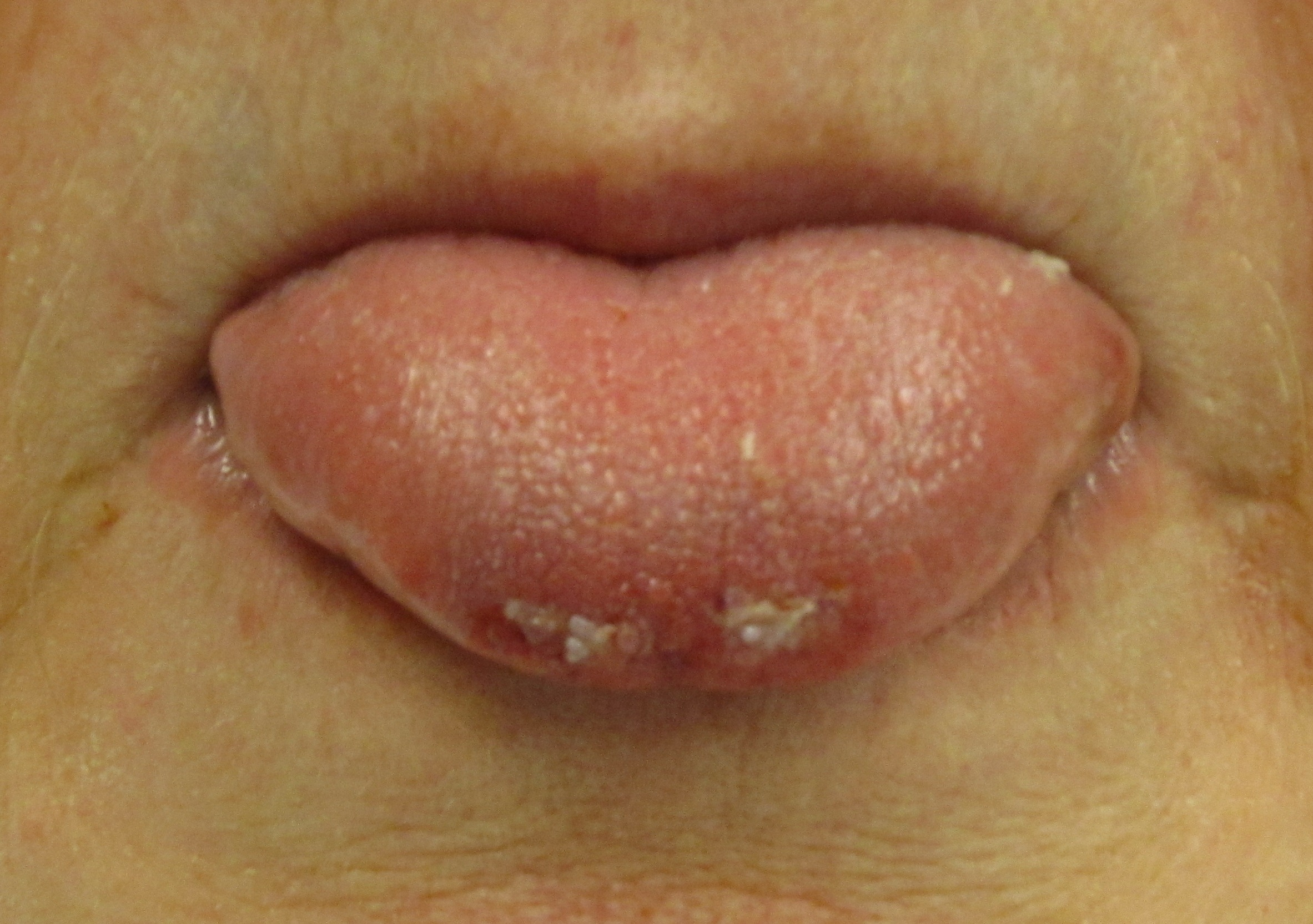
An individual who has bitten the tip of their tongue while having a seizure

Events leading up to the seizure and what movements occurred during the seizure are important in classifying the type of seizure. The person's memory of what happened before and during the seizure is also important. However, since most people that experience seizures do not remember what happened, it is best to get history from a witness when possible. Video recording of the seizure is also helpful in diagnosis of seizures. Events that occurred after the seizure are also an important part of the history. Past medical history, such as past head trauma, past strokes, past febrile seizures, or past infections, are helpful. In babies and children, information about developmental milestones, birth history, and previous illnesses are important as potential epilepsy risk factors. Family history of seizures is also important in evaluating risk for epilepsy. History regarding medication use, substance use, and alcohol use is important in determining a cause of the seizure.

Most people are in a postictal state (drowsy or confused) following a seizure. A bite mark on the side of the tongue or bleeding from the mouth strongly indicates a seizure happened. But only a third of people who have had a seizure have such a bite. Weakness of one limb or asymmetric reflexes are also signs a seizure just occurred. Presence of urinary incontinence or fecal incontinence also strongly suggests a seizure occurred. However, most people who have had a seizure will have a normal physical exam.

=== Tests ===
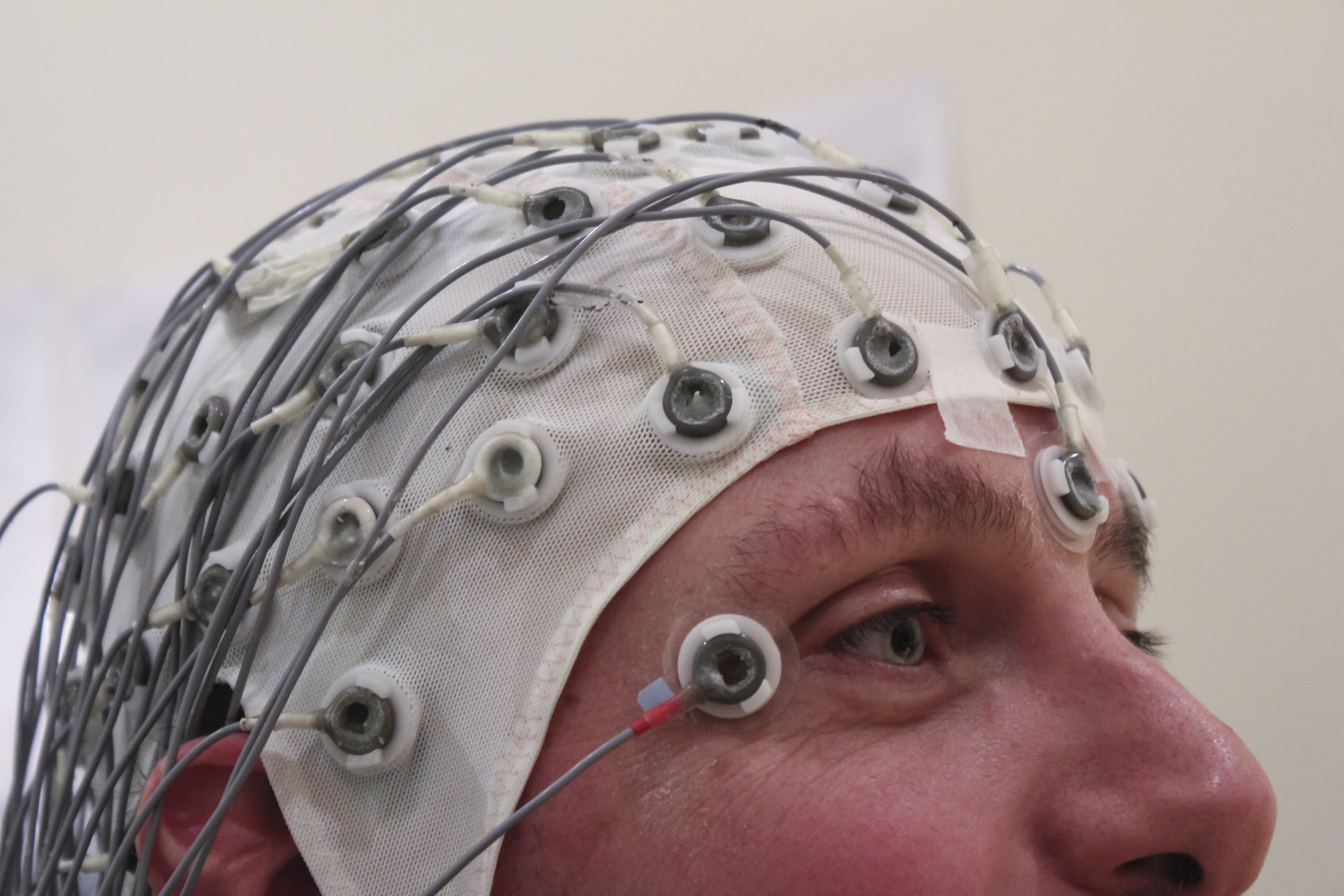
An EEG can aid in locating the focus of the epileptic seizure.

Blood tests can determine if there are any reversible causes of the seizure (provoked seizures). This includes a complete blood count that may show infection. A comprehensive metabolic panel is ordered to rule out abnormal sugar levels (hypoglycemia or hyperglycemia) or electrolyte abnormalities (such as hyponatremia) as a cause. A lumbar puncture is mainly done if there is reason to believe infection or inflammation of the nervous system is occurring. Toxicology screening is also mainly done if history is suggestive.

Brain imaging by CT scan and MRI is recommended after a first seizure, especially if no provoking factors are discovered. It is done to detect structural problems inside the brain, such as tumors. MRI is generally the better imaging test, but CT scan is preferred when intracranial bleeding is suspected. Imaging may be done at a later point in time in those who return to their normal selves while in the emergency room. When CT findings are normal in patients with a first unprovoked seizure, a follow-up MRI is recommended because it may detect epileptogenic lesions not visible on CT.

An electroencephalography (EEG) measures the brain's electrical activity. It is used in cases of first seizures that have no provoking factor, normal head imaging, and no prior history of head trauma. It will help determine the type of seizure or epilepsy syndrome present, as well as where the seizures are coming from if focal. It is also used when a person has not returned to baseline after a seizure for a prolonged time. EEG monitoring is frequently performed in the inpatient setting within a hospital's epilepsy monitoring unit (EMU), but in some cases, portable EEGs may be used in the outpatient setting for seizure monitoring.

=== Differential diagnosis ===
Other conditions that commonly get mistaken for a seizure include syncope, psychogenic nonepileptic seizures, cardiac arrhythmias, migraine headaches, and stroke/transient ischemic attacks.

=== Cincinnati method ===
The "Cincinnati method" involves asking the patient repeatedly, immediately after the seizure to read a single sentence shown on a card. It can be used to lateralize the seizure, and is extremely cost-effective to administer. The method was invented in 1988 at the Cincinnati University Hospital in Cincinnati, Ohio.

== Management ==
During an active seizure, the person seizing should be slowly laid on the floor. Witnesses should not try to stop the convulsions or other movements. Potentially sharp or dangerous objects should be moved from the area around a person experiencing a seizure so that the individual is not hurt. Nothing should be placed in the person's mouth as it is a choking hazard. After the seizure, if the person is not fully conscious and alert, they should be turned to their side to prevent choking. This is called recovery position. Timing of the seizure is also important. If a seizure is longer than five minutes, or there are two or more seizures occurring in five minutes, it is a medical emergency known as status epilepticus. Emergency services should be called.

=== Medication ===
The first line medication for an actively seizing person is a benzodiazepine, with most guidelines recommending lorazepam. Diazepam and midazolam are alternatives. It may be given in IV if emergency services are present. Rectal and intranasal forms also exist if a child has had seizures previously and was prescribed the rescue medication. If seizures continue, second-line therapy includes phenytoin, fosphenytoin, and phenobarbital. Levetiracetam or valproate may also be used.

Starting anti-seizure medications is not typically recommended if it was a provoked seizure that can be corrected. Examples of causes of provoked seizures that can be corrected include low blood sugar, low blood sodium, febrile seizures in children, and substance/medication use. Starting anti-seizure medications is usually for those with medium to high risk of seizures re-occurring. This includes people with unprovoked seizures with abnormal brain imaging or abnormal EEG. It also includes those who have had more than one unprovoked seizure more than 24 hours apart.

It is recommended to start with one anti-seizure medication. Another may be added if one is not enough to control the seizure occurrence. Approximately 70% of people can obtain full control with continuous use of medication. The type of medication used is based on the type of seizure.

Patients with acute repetitive seizures (also known as "seizure clusters") have recurrent seizures within 6-24 hours of the first episode and are at an increased risk of developing status epilepticus. They are often prescribed rescue benzodiazepines in the form of rectal gels or nasal sprays for at-home use during emergencies.

Anti-seizure medications may be slowly stopped after some time if a person has just experienced one seizure and has not had any more. The decision to stop anti-seizure medications should be discussed between the doctor and patient, weighing the benefits and risks.

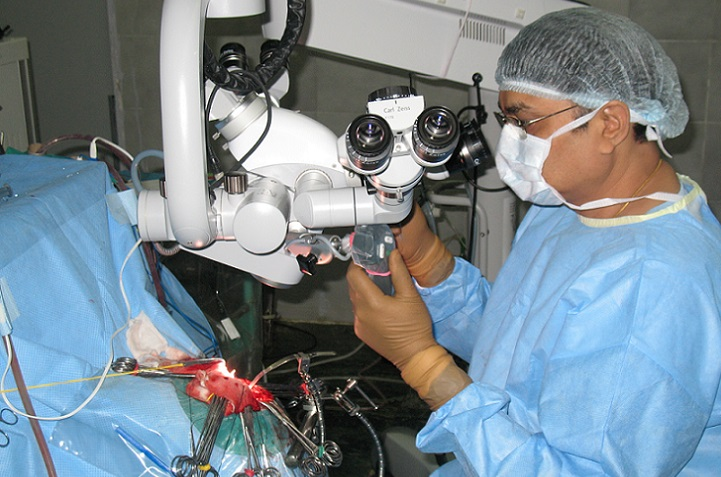
Doctor performing an epilepsy surgery at Jaslok Hospital, Mumbai, 2010

In severe cases where seizures are uncontrolled by at least two anti-seizure medications, brain surgery can be a treatment option. Epilepsy surgery is especially useful for those with focal seizures, where the seizures are coming from a specific part of the brain. The amount of brain removed during the surgery depends on the extent of the brain involved in the seizures. It can range from just removing one lobe of the brain (temporal lobectomy) to disconnecting an entire side of the brain (hemispherectomy). The procedure can be curative, where seizures are eliminated. However, if it is not curative, it can be palliative, reducing the frequency of seizures but not eliminating them.

Another intervention for refractory epilepsy is vagus nerve stimulation (VNS), which involves insertion of an electrical device that stimulates the left vagus nerve. Its mechanism of action is not fully understood. VNS is contraindicated in patients with cardiac conduction problems, sleep apnea, and should be avoided in patients with programmable shunt valves. The most common side effect associated with VNS is hoarseness, and side effects usually improve over time or with decreased levels of stimulation.

=== Diet ===
A ketogenic diet or modified Atkins diet may help in those who have epilepsy who do not improve following typical treatments, with evidence for its effectiveness growing. The diet leads to an increased elevation of plasma decanoic acid and ketones. However, some research is giving the indication that it is the decanoic acid that is anti-convulsant.

==== Other ====
Helmets may be used to protect the head during a seizure. Some claim that seizure response dogs, a form of service dog, can predict seizures. Evidence for this, however, is poor. Cannabis has also been used for the management of seizures that do not respond to anti-seizure medications. Research on its effectiveness is ongoing, but current research shows that it does reduce seizure frequency.

== Prognosis ==
Following a first unprovoked seizure, the risk of more seizures in the next two years is around 40%. Starting anti-seizure medications reduces the recurrence of seizures by 35% within the first two years. The greatest predictors of more seizures are problems either on the EEG or on imaging of the brain. Those with normal EEG and normal physical exam following a first unprovoked seizure had less risk of recurrence in the next two years, with a risk of 25%. In adults, after 6 months of being seizure-free after a first seizure, the risk of a subsequent seizure in the next year is less than 20% regardless of treatment. The prognosis of epilepsy depends on seizure type, cause, and treatment response. About two-thirds of patients achieve seizure control with medication, while surgery or neuromodulation may help those with drug-resistant epilepsy.

== Epidemiology ==
Approximately 8–10% of people will experience an epileptic seizure during their lifetime. In adults, the risk of seizure recurrence within the five years following a new-onset seizure is 35%; the risk rises to 75% in persons who have had a second seizure. In children, the risk of seizure recurrence within the five years following a single unprovoked seizure is about 50%; the risk rises to about 80% after two unprovoked seizures. In the United States in 2011, seizures resulted in an estimated 1.6 million emergency department visits; approximately 400,000 of these visits were for new-onset seizures.

== History ==
Epileptic seizures were first described in an Akkadian text from 2000 B.C. The perception of epilepsy, however, began to change in the time of Ancient Greek medicine. The term "epilepsy" itself is a Greek word, which is derived from the verb "epilambanein", meaning "to seize, possess, or afflict". Early reports of epilepsy often saw seizures and convulsions as the work of "evil spirits". Although the Ancient Greeks referred to epilepsy as the "sacred disease", this perception of epilepsy as a "spiritual" disease was challenged by Hippocrates in his work On the Sacred Disease, who proposed that the source of epilepsy was from natural causes rather than supernatural ones.

Early surgical treatment of epilepsy was primitive in Ancient Greek, Roman and Egyptian medicine. The 19th century saw the rise of targeted surgery for the treatment of epileptic seizures, beginning in 1886 with localized resections performed by Sir Victor Horsley, a neurosurgeon in London. Another advancement was that of the development by the Montreal procedure by Canadian neurosurgeon Wilder Penfield, which involved use of electrical stimulation among conscious patients to more accurately identify and resect the epileptic areas in the brain.

== Society and culture ==
=== Economics ===
Seizures result in direct economic costs of about one billion dollars in the United States. Epilepsy results in economic costs in Europe of around €15.5 billion in 2004. In India, epilepsy is estimated to result in costs of US$1.7 billion or 0.5% of the GDP. They make up about 1% of emergency department visits (2% for emergency departments for children) in the United States.

== Research ==
Much of recent epilepsy research has been focused on identifying causes for seizures, predicting them, and preventing their onset.

Some types of seizures occur due to genetic mutations, such as those found in ion channels. Current genetic epilepsy research is aimed at identifying genetic risk factors, understanding mutations, and developing genetic therapies. The development of next-generation sequencing has significantly advanced the understanding of gene-driven epilepsies. Presently, there are experiments using stem cells for the study and management of genetic epilepsy.

Seizure prediction is a special case of seizure detection in which the developed systems can issue a warning before the clinical onset of the epileptic seizure. Recently, biomarkers have been used for seizure prediction and prevention. These are methods of measuring changes that occur in patients with seizures to differentiate them from people without seizures. One example of biomarkers is the use of microelectrodes, which can be used to monitor abnormal electrical brain activity. Another example is diffusion tensor imaging MRI, which can show differences in structural connectivity in individuals with epilepsy.

There are ongoing investigations to identify mechanisms to treat seizures, with the most promising recent discoveries involving the mTOR pathway and the cytokine (small signaling protein) IL-1ß. Several other structures and cells are also the topic of study, including cellular membrane proteins, components of the blood-brain barrier, glial cells, and antibodies. For treatment of genetic disorders, a process called transfection involves the use of vectors to deliver pieces of genetic material to areas of the brain involved in seizure onset.

Computational neuroscience has brought a new perspective on seizures by considering the dynamical aspects.
