= Acquired brain injury =

Brain damage caused by events after birth

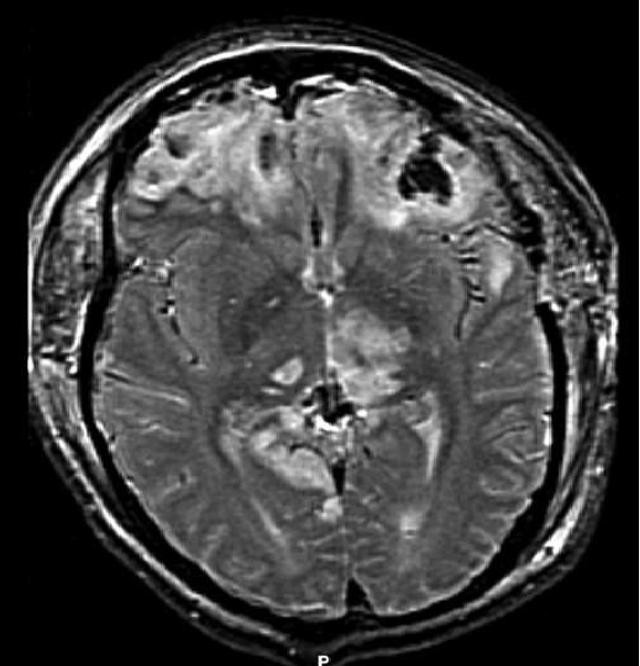
- Brain injury with herniation MRI
- Specialty: Neurology

Acquired brain injury (ABI) is brain damage caused by events after birth, rather than as part of a genetic or congenital disorder such as fetal alcohol syndrome, perinatal illness or perinatal hypoxia. ABI can result in cognitive, physical, emotional, or behavioural impairments that lead to permanent or temporary changes in functioning. These impairments result from either traumatic brain injury (e.g. physical trauma due to accidents, assaults, neurosurgery, head injury etc.) or nontraumatic injury derived from either an internal or external source (e.g. stroke, brain tumours, infection, poisoning, hypoxia, ischemia, encephalopathy or substance abuse). ABI does not include damage to the brain resulting from neurodegenerative disorders.

While research has demonstrated that thinking and behavior may be altered in virtually all forms of ABI, brain injury is itself a very complex phenomenon having dramatically varied effects. No two persons can expect the same outcome or resulting difficulties. The brain controls every part of human life: physical, intellectual, behavioral, social and emotional. When the brain is damaged, some part of a person's life will be adversely affected.

Advances in emergency medicine and critical care have increased survival rates among brain injury populations, leading to a growing number of individuals living with chronic disabilities after sustaining brain injury. Reviews emphasize the importance of proper rehabilitation and community support for these individuals.

Consequences of ABI often require a major life adjustment around the person's new circumstances, and making that adjustment is a critical factor in recovery and rehabilitation. While the outcome of a given injury depends largely upon the nature and severity of the injury itself, appropriate treatment plays a vital role in determining the level of recovery.

== Signs and symptoms ==
Symptoms:

- Anhedonia
- Apraxia
- Aphasia
- Amnesia

Behavioral manifestations:

- Adynamia
- Disinhibition
- Emotional flooding
- Perseveration

=== Emotional ===
ABI has been associated with a number of emotional difficulties such as depression, issues with self-control, managing anger impulses and challenges with problem-solving, these challenges also contribute to psychosocial concerns involving social anxiety, loneliness and lower levels of self esteem. These psychosocial problems have been found to contribute to other dilemmas such as reduced frequency of social contact and leisure activities, unemployment, family problems and marital difficulties.

How the patient copes with the injury has been found to influence the level at which they experience the emotional complications correlated with ABI. Three coping strategies for emotions related to ABI have presented themselves in the research, approach-oriented coping, passive coping and avoidant coping. Approach-oriented coping has been found to be the most effective strategy, as it has been negatively correlated with rates of apathy and depression in ABI patients; this coping style is present in individuals who consciously work to minimize the emotional challenges of ABI. Passive coping has been characterized by the person choosing not to express emotions and a lack of motivation which can lead to poor outcomes for the individual. Increased levels of depression have been correlated to avoidance coping methods in patients with ABI; this strategy is represented in people who actively evade coping with emotions. These challenges and coping strategies should be kept in consideration when seeking to understand individuals with ABI.

=== Memory ===
Following acquired brain injury it is common for people to experience memory loss; memory disorders are one of the most prevalent cognitive deficits experienced in affected people. However, because some aspects of memory are directly linked to attention, it can be challenging to assess what components of a deficit are caused by memory and which are fundamentally attention problems. There is often partial recovery of memory functioning following the initial recovery phase; however, permanent handicaps are often reported with ABI patients reporting significantly more memory difficulties when compared people without an acquired brain injury.

In order to cope more efficiently with memory disorders many people with ABI use memory aids; these included external items such as diaries, notebooks and electronic organizers, internal strategies such as visual associations, and environmental adaptations such as labelling kitchen cupboards. Research has found that ABI patients use an increased number of memory aids after their injury than they did prior to it and these aids vary in their degree of effectiveness. One popular aid is the use of a diary. Studies have found that the use of a diary is more effective if it is paired with self-instructional training, as training leads to more frequent use of the diary over time and thus more successful use as a memory aid.

== Causes ==
Relations to Acquired Brain injury can occur in a variety of ways. In adults aged 65 plus, 82.9% of hospitalizations were related to falls, about 13% experienced death shortly after. Furthermore, transportation related accidents were around 9% in correlation to brain injury. The number of hospitalizations related to brain injury is only increasing as well. Tripping, slipping, or stumbling is one of the biggest ways of experiencing these brain related injuries.

Additionally, an acquired brain injury can happen due to anoxia. This is often caused by carbon monoxide poisoning or drowning, as the lack of oxygen in these situations causes cell death.

== Management ==
Rehabilitation following an acquired brain injury does not follow a set protocol, due to the variety of mechanisms of injury and structures affected. Rather, rehabilitation is an individualized process that will often involve a multi-disciplinary approach. The rehabilitation team may include but is not limited to nurses, neurologists, physiotherapists, psychiatrists (particularly those specialized in Brain Injury Medicine), occupational therapists, speech-language pathologists, music therapists, and rehabilitation psychologists. Physical therapy and other professions may be utilized post- brain injury in order to control muscle tone, regain normal movement patterns, and maximize functional independence. Rehabilitation should be patient-centered and guided by the individual's needs and goals.

Research in physical medicine and rehabilitation call attention to the importance of timing, intensity, and continuity of therapy after acquired brain injury. Systematic reviews have shown that rehabilitation through coordinated programs such as inpatient rehabilitation centers are associated with improved functional outcomes compared to those with less organized care. Outcomes are improved when therapies are persistent over time as well. However, outcomes vary among individuals and studies emphasize the difficulties in comparing results due to differences in injury severity, treatment settings, comorbidities, and outcome measures. Rehabilitation outcomes are commonly measured through functional status such as level of independence when performing everyday activities and return-to-work rates. This is how the effectiveness of different rehabilitation programs are evaluated. Long-term follow up is usually required after acquired brain injury because functional recovery may continue for months or years after the injury.

There is some evidence that rhythmic auditory stimulation is beneficial in gait rehabilitation following a brain injury. Music therapy may assist patients to improve gait, arm swing while walking, communication, and quality of life after experiencing a stroke. Newer treatment methods such as virtual reality and robotics remain under-researched; however, there is reason to believe that virtual reality in upper limb rehabilitation may be useful, following an acquired brain injury.

Due to few random control trials and generally weak evidence, more research is needed to gain a complete understanding of the ideal type and parameters of therapeutic interventions for treatment of acquired brain injuries.

For more information on therapeutic interventions for acquired brain injury, see stroke and traumatic brain injury.

=== Memory ===
Some strategies for rehabilitating the memory of those affected by ABI have used repetitive tasks to attempt to increase the patients' ability to recall information. While this type of training increases performance on the task at hand, there is little evidence that the skills translate to improved performance on memory challenges outside of the laboratory. Awareness of memory strategies, motivation and dedication to increasing memory have been related to successful increases in memory capability among patients an example of this could be the use of attention process training and brain injury education in patients with memory disorders related to brain injury. These have been shown to increase memory functioning in patients based on self-report measures.

Another strategy for improvement amongst individuals with poor memory functioning is the use of elaboration to improve encoding of items, one form of this strategy is called self-imagining whereby the patient imagines the event to be recalled from a more personal perspective. Self-imagining has been found to improve recognition memory by coding the event in a manner that is more individually salient to the subject. This effect has been found to improve recall in individuals with and without memory disorders.

There is research evidence to suggest that rehabilitation programs that are geared toward the individual may have greater results than group-based interventions for improving memory in ABI patients because they are tailored to the symptoms experienced by the individual.

More research is necessary in order to draw conclusions on how to improve memory among individuals with ABI that experience memory loss.

== Special population ==
=== Children ===
In children and youth with pediatric acquired brain injury the cognitive and emotional difficulties that stem from their injury can negatively impact their level of participation in home, school and other social situations, participation in structured events has been found to be especially hindered under these circumstances. Involvement in social situations is important for the normal development of children as a means of gaining an understanding of how to effectively work together with others. Furthermore, young people with ABI are often reported as having insufficient problem solving skills. This has the potential to hinder their performance in various academic and social settings further. It is important for rehabilitation programs to deal with these challenges specific to children who have not fully developed at the time of their injury.

== Notable cases ==
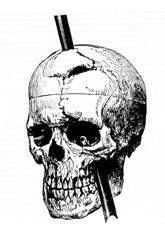
Phineas Gage's accident

There have been many popularized cases of various forms of ABI such as:

- Phineas Gage's case of traumatic brain injury that greatly stimulated discussion on brain function and physiology
- Henry Molaison, formerly known as patient H.M., underwent neurosurgery to remove scar tissue in his brain that was causing debilitating epileptic seizures, neurosurgeon William Beecher Scoville performed the surgery which created bilateral lesions near the hippocampus. These lesions helped remove symptoms of the epilepsy in Molaison but resulted in anterograde amnesia. Molaison has been studied by hundreds of researchers since this time, most notably Brenda Milner, and has been greatly influential in the study of memory and the brain.
- Zasetsky injured in the Battle of Smolensk, bullet entered his left parieto-occipital area and resulted in a long coma. Following this, he developed a form of agnosia and became unable to perceive the right side of things.

== See also ==
- Brain damage
- Chronic traumatic encephalopathy
- Concussion
- Head injury
- Neurodegeneration
- Rehabilitation psychology
- Traumatic brain injury
