= Traumatic brain injury =

Injury of the brain from an external source

- Other names: Intracranial injury, physically induced brain injury
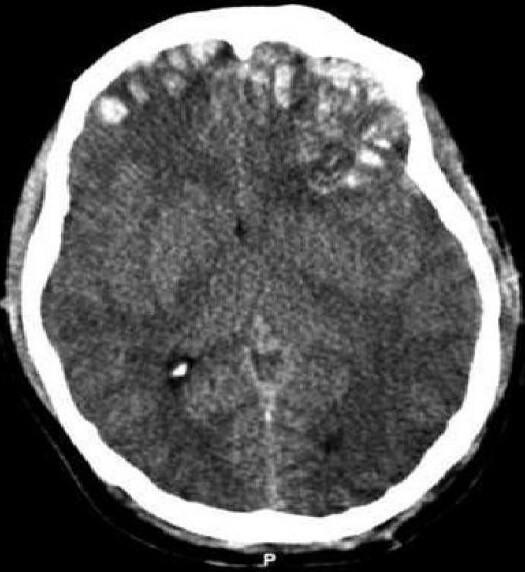
- CT scan showing cerebral contusions, hemorrhage within the hemispheres, and subdural hematoma. There is also displaced skull fracture of left transverse parietal and temporal bones.
- Specialty: Neurology, Neurosurgery, Emergency medicine
- Symptoms: Physical, cognitive, sensory, social, emotional, and behavioral symptoms
- Types: Mild to severe
- Causes: Trauma to the head
- Risk factors: Old age, alcohol
- Diagnostic method: Based on neurological exam, medical imaging
- Treatment: Supportive care, surgery
- Medication: Mannitol, hypertonic saline
- Frequency: 0.03%

A traumatic brain injury (TBI), also known as an intracranial injury, is an injury to the brain caused by an external force. TBI can be classified based on severity ranging from mild traumatic brain injury (mTBI/concussion) to severe traumatic brain injury. TBI can also be characterized based on mechanism (closed or penetrating head injury) or other features (e.g., occurring in a specific location or over a widespread area). Head injury is a broader category that may involve damage to other structures such as the scalp and skull. TBI can result in physical, cognitive, social, emotional and behavioral symptoms, and outcomes can range from complete recovery to permanent disability or death. Causes include falls, vehicle collisions, and violence. Brain trauma occurs as a consequence of a sudden acceleration or deceleration of the brain within the skull or by a complex combination of both movement and sudden impact. In addition to the damage caused at the moment of injury, a variety of events following the injury may result in further injury. These processes may include alterations in cerebral blood flow and pressure within the skull. Some of the imaging techniques used for diagnosis of moderate to severe TBI include computed tomography (CT) and magnetic resonance imaging (MRIs).

Prevention measures include use of seat belts and helmets, following safety rules, not drinking and driving, fall prevention efforts in older adults, neuromuscular training, and safety measures for children. Depending on the injury, treatment required may be minimal or may include interventions such as medications, emergency surgery or surgery years later. Physical therapy, speech therapy, recreation therapy, occupational therapy and vision therapy may be employed for rehabilitation. Counseling, supported employment and community support services may also be useful.

TBI is a major cause of death and disability worldwide, especially in children and young adults. Males sustain traumatic brain injuries around twice as often as females. The 20th century saw developments in diagnosis and treatment that decreased death rates and improved outcomes.

== Classification ==
Traumatic brain injury is defined as damage to the brain resulting from external mechanical force, such as rapid acceleration or deceleration, impact, blast waves, or penetration by a projectile. Brain function is temporarily or permanently impaired and structural damage may or may not be detectable with current technology.

TBI is one of two subsets of acquired brain injury (brain damage that occurs after birth); the other subset is non-traumatic brain injury, which does not involve external mechanical force (examples include stroke and infection). All traumatic brain injuries are head injuries, but the latter term may also refer to injury to other parts of the head; however, the terms head injury and brain injury are often used interchangeably. Similarly, brain injuries fall under the classification of central nervous system injuries and neurotrauma. In neuropsychology research literature, in general the term "traumatic brain injury" is used to refer to non-penetrating traumatic brain injuries.

TBI is usually classified based on severity, anatomical features of the injury, and the mechanism (the causative forces). Mechanism-related classification divides TBI into closed and penetrating head injury. A closed (also called nonpenetrating, or blunt) injury occurs when the brain is not exposed. A penetrating, or open, head injury occurs when an object pierces the skull and breaches the dura mater, the outermost membrane surrounding the brain.

=== Severity ===
Severity of traumatic brain injury
	GCS	PTA	LOC
Mild	13–15	<1 day	0–30 minutes
Moderate	9–12	>1 to <7 days	>30 min to <24 hours
Severe	3–8	>7 days	>24 hours

Brain injuries can be classified into mild, moderate, and severe categories. The Glasgow Coma Scale (GCS), the most commonly used system for classifying TBI severity, grades a person's level of consciousness on a scale of 3–15 based on verbal, motor, and eye-opening reactions to stimuli. In general, it is agreed that a TBI with a GCS of 13 or above is mild, 9–12 is moderate, and 8 or below is severe. Similar systems exist for young children; however, the GCS grading system has limited ability to predict outcomes. Because of this, other classification systems such as the one shown in the table are also used to help determine severity. A current model developed by the Department of Defense and Department of Veterans Affairs uses all three criteria of GCS after resuscitation, duration of post-traumatic amnesia (PTA), and loss of consciousness (LOC). It also has been proposed to use changes that are visible on neuroimaging, such as swelling, focal lesions, or diffuse injury as method of classification.

=== Pathological features ===
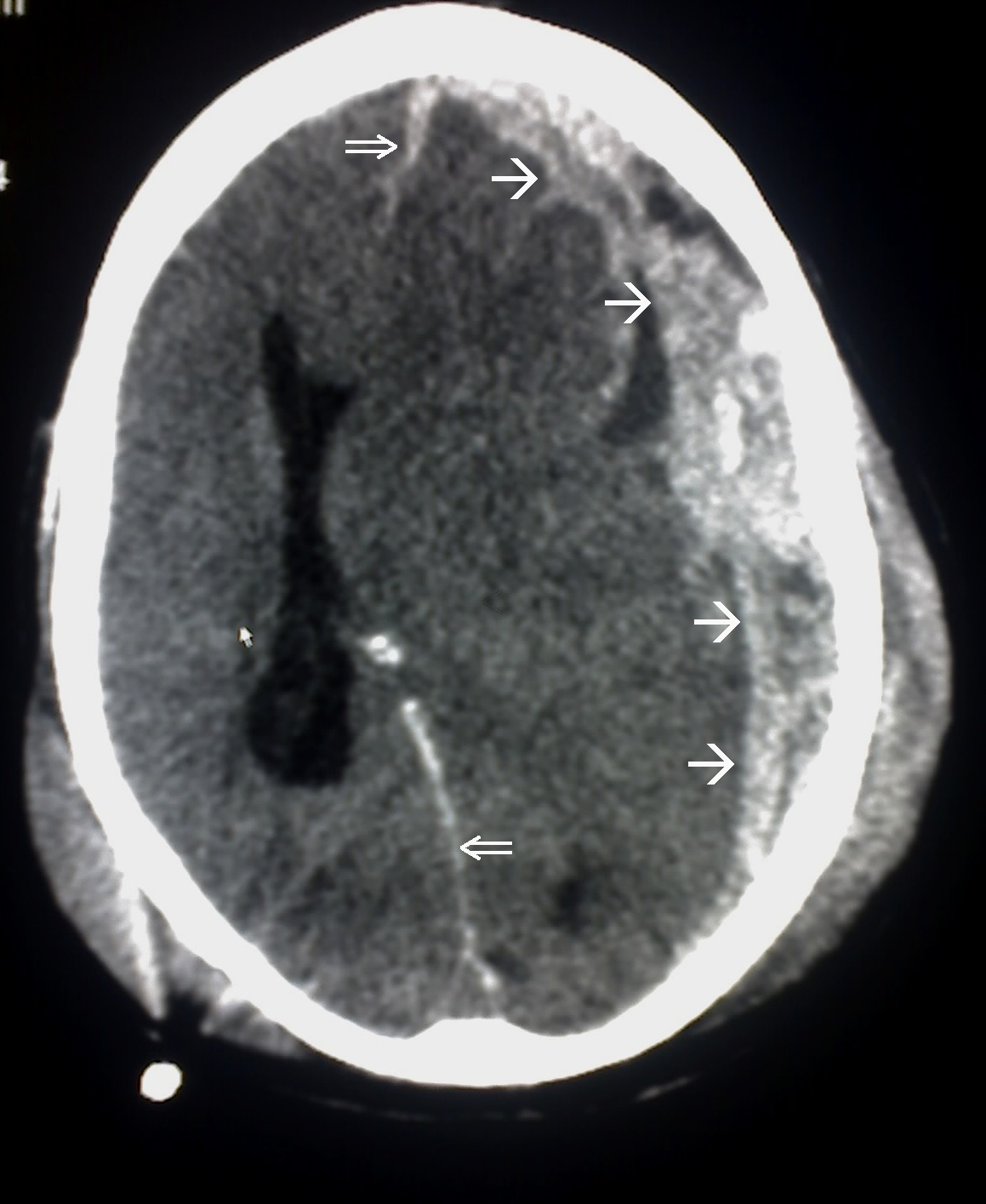
CT scan showing spread of the subdural hematoma (single arrows), midline shift (double arrows)

Systems also exist to classify TBI by its pathological features. Lesions can be extra-axial, (occurring within the skull but outside of the brain) or intra-axial (occurring within the brain tissue). Damage from TBI can be focal or diffuse, confined to specific areas or distributed in a more general manner, respectively; however, it is common for both types of injury to exist in a given case.

Diffuse injury manifests with little apparent damage in neuroimaging studies, but lesions can be seen with microscopy techniques post-mortem, and in the early 2000s, researchers discovered that diffusion tensor imaging (DTI), a way of processing MRI images that shows white matter tracts, was an effective tool for displaying the extent of diffuse axonal injury. Types of injuries considered diffuse include edema (swelling), concussion and diffuse axonal injury, which is widespread damage to axons including white matter tracts and projections to the cortex.

Focal injuries often produce symptoms related to the functions of the damaged area. Research shows that the most common areas to have focal lesions in non-penetrating traumatic brain injury are the orbitofrontal cortex (the lower surface of the frontal lobes) and the anterior temporal lobes, areas that are involved in social behavior, emotion regulation, olfaction, and decision-making, hence the common social/emotional and judgment deficits following moderate-severe TBI. Symptoms such as hemiparesis or aphasia can also occur when less commonly affected areas such as motor or language areas are, respectively, damaged.

One type of focal injury, cerebral laceration, occurs when the tissue is cut or torn. Such tearing is common in orbitofrontal cortex in particular, because of bony protrusions on the interior skull ridge above the eyes. In a similar injury, cerebral contusion (bruising of brain tissue), blood is mixed among tissue. In contrast, intracranial hemorrhage involves bleeding that is not mixed with tissue.

Hematomas, also focal lesions, are collections of blood in or around the brain that can result from hemorrhage. Intracerebral hemorrhage, with bleeding in the brain tissue itself, is an intra-axial lesion. Extra-axial lesions include epidural hematoma, subdural hematoma, subarachnoid hemorrhage, and intraventricular hemorrhage. Epidural hematoma involves bleeding into the area between the skull and the dura mater, the outermost of the three membranes surrounding the brain. In subdural hematoma, bleeding occurs between the dura and the arachnoid mater. Subarachnoid hemorrhage involves bleeding into the space between the arachnoid membrane and the pia mater. Intraventricular hemorrhage occurs when there is bleeding in the ventricles.

== Signs and symptoms ==
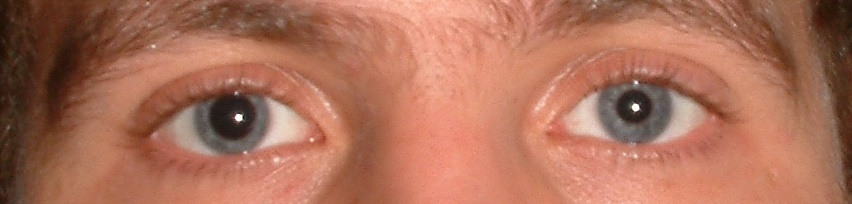
Unequal pupil size is potentially a sign of a serious brain injury.

Symptoms are dependent on the type of TBI (diffuse or focal) and the part of the brain that is affected. Unconsciousness tends to last longer for people with injuries on the left side of the brain than for those with injuries on the right. Symptoms are also dependent on the injury's severity. With mild TBI, the patient may remain conscious or may lose consciousness for a few seconds or minutes. Other symptoms of mild TBI include headache, vomiting, nausea, lack of motor coordination, dizziness, difficulty balancing, lightheadedness, blurred vision or tired eyes, ringing in the ears, bad taste in the mouth, fatigue or lethargy, and changes in sleep patterns. Cognitive and emotional symptoms include behavioral or mood changes, confusion, and trouble with memory, concentration, attention, or thinking. Mild TBI symptoms may also be present in moderate and severe injuries.

A person with a moderate or severe TBI may have a headache that does not go away, repeated vomiting or nausea, convulsions, an inability to awaken, dilation of one or both pupils, slurred speech, aphasia (word-finding difficulties), dysarthria (muscle weakness that causes disordered speech), weakness or numbness in the limbs, loss of coordination, confusion, restlessness, or agitation. Common long-term symptoms of moderate to severe TBI are changes in appropriate social behavior, deficits in social judgment, and cognitive changes, especially problems with sustained attention, processing speed, and executive functioning. Alexithymia, a deficiency in identifying, understanding, processing, and describing emotions occurs in 60.9% of individuals with TBI. Cognitive and social deficits have long-term consequences for the daily lives of people with moderate to severe TBI, but can be improved with appropriate rehabilitation.

When the pressure within the skull (intracranial pressure, abbreviated ICP) rises too high, it can be deadly. Signs of increased ICP include decreasing level of consciousness, paralysis or weakness on one side of the body, and a blown pupil, one that fails to constrict in response to light or is slow to do so. Cushing's triad, a slow heart rate with high blood pressure and respiratory depression, is a classic manifestation of significantly raised ICP. Anisocoria, unequal pupil size, is another sign of serious TBI. Abnormal posturing, a characteristic positioning of the limbs caused by severe diffuse injury or high ICP, is an ominous sign.

Small children with moderate to severe TBI may have some of these symptoms but have difficulty communicating them. Other signs seen in young children include persistent crying, inability to be consoled, listlessness, refusal to nurse or eat, and irritability.

== Causes ==
The most common causes of TBI in the U.S. include violence, transportation accidents, construction site mishaps, and sports. Motorbikes are major causes, increasing in significance in developing countries as other causes reduce. The estimates that between 1.6 and 3.8 million traumatic brain injuries each year are a result of sports and recreation activities in the US. In children aged two to four, falls are the most common cause of TBI, while in older children traffic accidents compete with falls for this position. TBI is the third most common injury to result from child abuse. Abuse causes 19% of cases of pediatric brain trauma, and the death rate is higher among these cases. Although men are twice as likely to have a TBI, domestic violence is another cause of TBI, as are work-related and industrial accidents. Firearms and blast injuries from explosions are other causes of TBI, which is the leading cause of death and disability in war zones. According to Representative Bill Pascrell (Democrat, NJ), TBI is "the signature injury of the wars in Iraq and Afghanistan."

== Mechanism ==
=== Physical forces ===
Ricochet of the brain within the skull may account for the coup-contrecoup phenomenon.

The type, direction, intensity, and duration of forces all contribute to the characteristics and severity of TBI. Forces that may contribute to TBI include angular, rotational, shear, and translational forces.

Even in the absence of an impact, significant acceleration or deceleration of the head can cause TBI; however in most cases, a combination of impact and acceleration is probably to blame. Forces involving the head striking or being struck by something, termed contact or impact loading, are the cause of most focal injuries, and movement of the brain within the skull, termed noncontact or inertial loading, usually causes diffuse injuries. The violent shaking of an infant that causes shaken baby syndrome commonly manifests as diffuse injury. In impact loading, the force sends shock waves through the skull and brain, resulting in tissue damage. Shock waves caused by penetrating injuries can also destroy tissue along the path of a projectile, compounding the damage caused by the missile itself.

Damage may occur directly under the site of impact, or it may occur on the side opposite the impact (coup and contrecoup injury, respectively). When a moving object impacts the stationary head, coup injuries are typical, while contrecoup injuries are usually produced when the moving head strikes a stationary object.

=== Primary and secondary injury ===
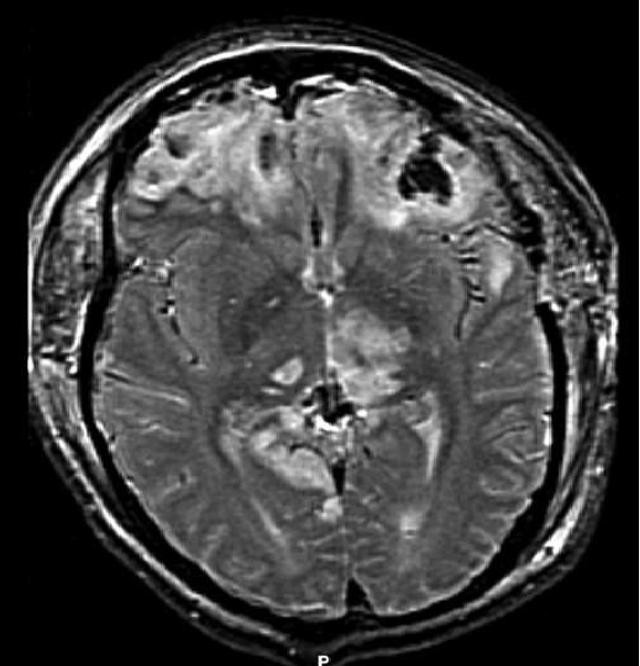
MRI scan showing damage due to brain herniation after TBI

A large percentage of the people killed by brain trauma do not die right away but rather days to weeks after the event; rather than improving after being hospitalized, some 40% of TBI patients deteriorate. Primary brain injury (the damage that occurs at the moment of trauma when tissues and blood vessels are stretched, compressed, and torn) is not adequate to explain this deterioration; rather, it is caused by secondary injury, a complex set of cellular processes and biochemical cascades that occur in the minutes to days following the trauma. These secondary processes can dramatically worsen the damage caused by primary injury and account for the greatest number of TBI deaths occurring in hospitals.

Secondary injury events include damage to the blood–brain barrier, release of factors that cause inflammation, free radical overload, excessive release of the neurotransmitter glutamate (excitotoxicity), influx of calcium and sodium ions into neurons, and dysfunction of mitochondria. Injured axons in the brain's white matter may separate from their cell bodies as a result of secondary injury, potentially killing those neurons. Other factors in secondary injury are changes in the blood flow to the brain; ischemia (insufficient blood flow); cerebral hypoxia (insufficient oxygen in the brain); cerebral edema (swelling of the brain); and raised intracranial pressure (the pressure within the skull). Intracranial pressure may rise due to swelling or a mass effect from a lesion, such as a hemorrhage. As a result, cerebral perfusion pressure (the pressure of blood flow in the brain) is reduced; ischemia results. When the pressure within the skull rises too high, it can cause brain death or brain herniation, in which parts of the brain are squeezed by structures in the skull.

== Diagnosis ==
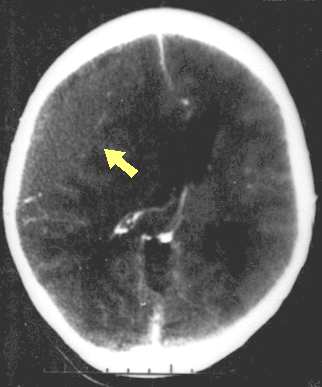
CT scan showing epidural hematoma (arrow)

Diagnosis is suspected based on lesion circumstances and clinical evidence, most prominently a neurological examination, for example checking whether the pupils constrict normally in response to light and assigning a Glasgow Coma Score. Neuroimaging helps in determining the diagnosis and prognosis and in deciding what treatments to give. DSM-5 can be utilized to diagnose TBI and its psychiatric sequelae. A mTBI, or concussion, cannot be seen on a CT or MRI.

The preferred radiologic test in the emergency setting to determine the severity of a TBI is computed tomography (CT): it is quick, accurate, and widely available. Follow-up CT scans may be performed later to determine whether the injury has progressed.

Magnetic resonance imaging (MRI) can show more detail than CT, and can add information about expected outcome in the long term. It is more useful than CT for detecting injury characteristics such as diffuse axonal injury in the longer term; however, MRI is not used in the emergency setting for reasons including its relative inefficacy in detecting bleeds and fractures, its lengthy acquisition of images, the inaccessibility of the patient in the machine, and its incompatibility with metal items used in emergency care. A variant of MRI since 2012 is high-definition fiber tracking (HDFT).

Other techniques may be used to confirm a particular diagnosis. X-rays are still used for head trauma, but evidence suggests they are not useful; head injuries are either so mild that they do not need imaging or severe enough to merit the more accurate CT. Angiography may be used to detect blood vessel pathology when risk factors such as penetrating head trauma are involved. Functional imaging can measure cerebral blood flow or metabolism, inferring neuronal activity in specific regions and potentially helping to predict outcome.

Neuropsychological assessment can be performed to evaluate the long-term cognitive sequelae and to aid in the planning of the rehabilitation. Instruments range from short measures of general mental functioning to complete batteries formed of different domain-specific tests.

== Prevention ==
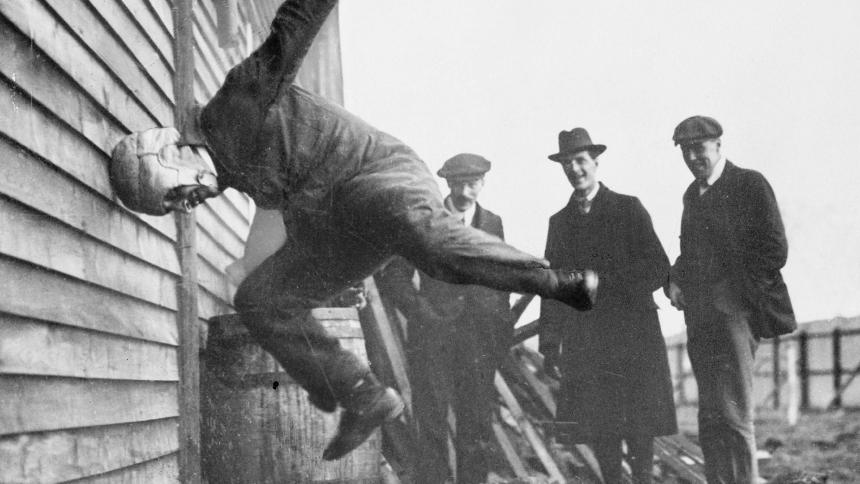
Demonstration in 1912 of the Warren Safety Helmet, which was designed to protect pilots but has often been wrongly described as a football helmet

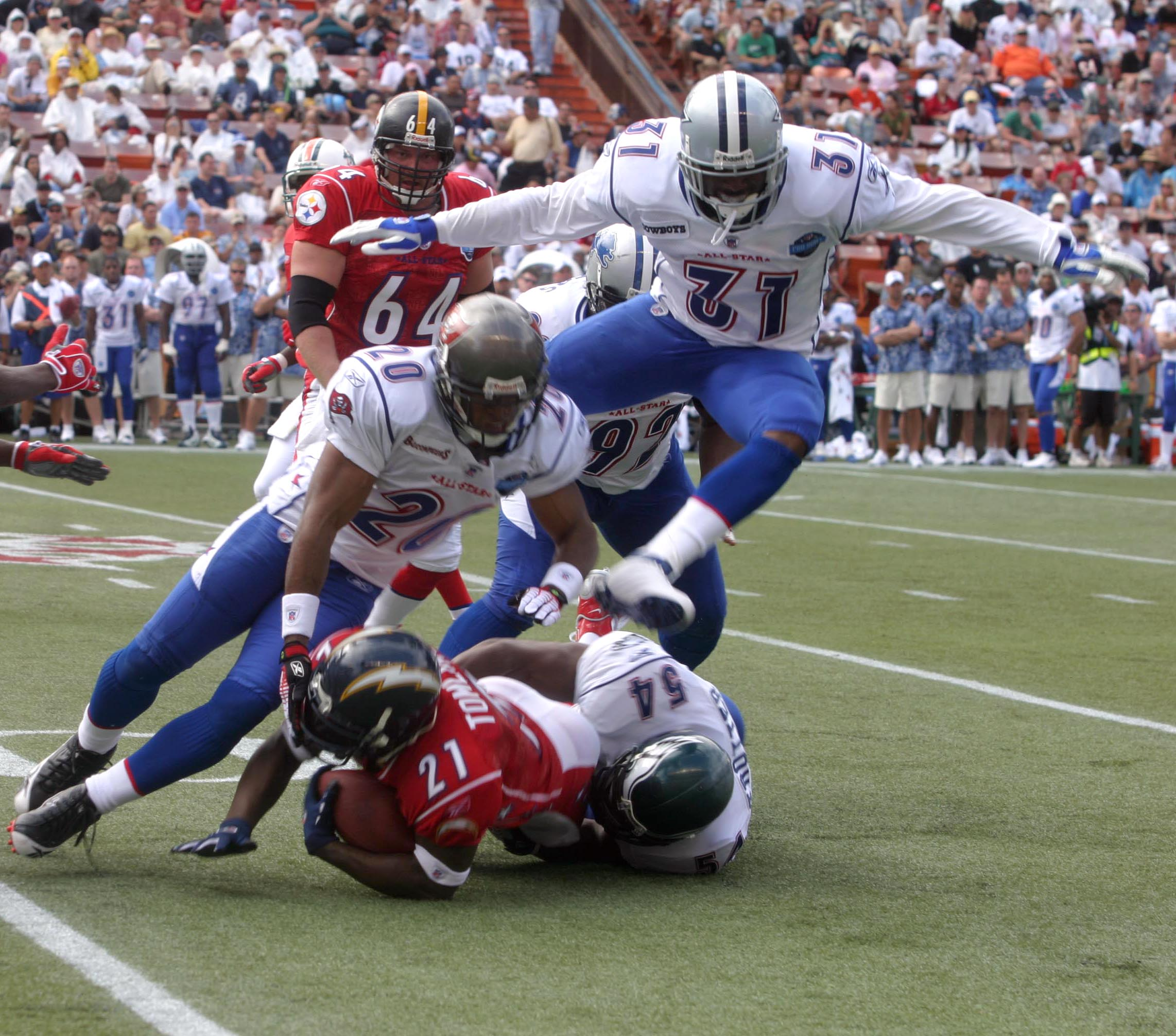
Protective sports equipment such as helmets can partially protect athletes from head injury.

Since vehicle accidents are a major cause of TBI, their prevention or the amelioration of their consequences can both reduce the incidence and gravity of TBI. In accidents, damage can be reduced by use of seat belts, child safety seats and motorcycle helmets, and presence of roll bars and airbags. Education programs exist to lower the number of crashes. In addition, changes to public policy and safety laws can be made; these include speed limits, seat belt and helmet laws, and road engineering practices.

Changes to common practices in sports have also been discussed. The appropriate use of helmets can reduce the incidence of TBI. Due to the possibility that repeatedly "heading" a ball practicing soccer could cause cumulative brain injury, the idea of introducing protective headgear for players has been proposed. Improved equipment design can enhance safety; softer baseballs reduce head injury risk. Rules against dangerous types of contact, such as "spear tackling" in American football, when one player tackles another head first, may also reduce head injury rates.

Falls can be avoided by installing grab bars in bathrooms and handrails on stairways; removing tripping hazards such as throw rugs; or installing window guards and safety gates at the top and bottom of stairs around young children. Playgrounds with shock-absorbing surfaces such as mulch or sand also prevent head injuries. Child abuse prevention is another tactic; programs exist to prevent shaken baby syndrome by educating about the dangers of shaking children. Gun safety, including keeping guns unloaded and locked, is another preventative measure. Studies on the effect of laws that aim to control access to guns in the United States have been insufficient to determine their effectiveness preventing number of deaths or injuries.

== Treatment ==
It is important to begin emergency treatment within the so-called "golden hour" following the injury. People with moderate to severe injuries are likely to receive treatment in an intensive care unit followed by a neurosurgical ward. Treatment depends on the recovery stage of the patient. In the acute stage, the primary aim is to stabilize the patient and focus on preventing further injury. This is because the initial damage caused by trauma cannot be reversed. Rehabilitation is the main treatment for the subacute and chronic stages of recovery. International clinical guidelines have been proposed with the aim of guiding decisions in TBI treatment, as defined by an authoritative examination of current evidence.

=== Acute stage ===
Tranexamic acid within three hours of a head injury decreases the risk of death. Certain facilities are equipped to handle TBI better than others; initial measures include transporting patients to an appropriate treatment center. Both during transport and in hospital the primary concerns are ensuring proper oxygen supply, maintaining adequate blood flow to the brain, and controlling raised intracranial pressure (ICP), since high ICP deprives the brain of badly needed blood flow and can cause deadly brain herniation. Other methods to prevent damage include management of other injuries and prevention of seizures. Some data supports the use of hyperbaric oxygen therapy to improve outcomes. Further research is required to determine the effectiveness and clinical importance of positioning the head at different angles (degrees of head-of-bed elevation) while the person is being treated in intensive care.

Neuroimaging is helpful but not flawless in detecting raised ICP. A more accurate way to measure ICP is to place a catheter into a ventricle of the brain, which has the added benefit of allowing cerebrospinal fluid to drain, releasing pressure in the skull. Treatment of raised ICP may be as simple as tilting the person's bed and straightening the head to promote blood flow through the veins of the neck. Sedatives, analgesics and paralytic agents are often used. Propofol and midazolam are equally effective as sedatives.

Hypertonic saline can improve ICP by reducing the amount of cerebral water (swelling), though it is used with caution to avoid electrolyte imbalances or heart failure. Mannitol, an osmotic diuretic, appears to be as effective as hypertonic saline at reducing ICP; however, some concerns have been raised regarding some of the studies performed. Hyertonic saline is also suitable in children with severe traumatic brain injury.

Hyperventilation (larger and/or faster breaths) reduces carbon dioxide levels and causes blood vessels to constrict; this decreases blood flow to the brain and reduces ICP, but it potentially causes ischemia and is, therefore, used only in the short term. Giving corticosteroids is associated with an increased risk of death, and so their routine use is not recommended. There is no strong evidence that the following pharmaceutical interventions should be recommended to routinely treat TBI: magnesium, monoaminergic and dopamine agonists, progesterone, aminosteroids, excitatory amino acid reuptake inhibitors, beta-2 antagonists (bronchodilators), haemostatic and antifibrinolytic drugs.

Endotracheal intubation and mechanical ventilation may be used to ensure proper oxygen supply and provide a secure airway. Hypotension (low blood pressure), which has a devastating outcome in TBI, can be prevented by giving intravenous fluids to maintain a normal blood pressure. Failing to maintain blood pressure can result in inadequate blood flow to the brain. Blood pressure may be kept at an artificially high level under controlled conditions by infusion of norepinephrine or similar drugs; this helps maintain cerebral perfusion. Body temperature is carefully regulated because increased temperature raises the brain's metabolic needs, potentially depriving it of nutrients. Seizures are common. While they can be treated with benzodiazepines, these drugs are used carefully because they can depress breathing and lower blood pressure. Anti-convulsant medications have only been found to be useful for reducing the risk of an early seizure. Phenytoin and levetiracetam appear to have similar levels of effectiveness for preventing early seizures. People with TBI are more susceptible to side effects and may react adversely to some medications. During treatment monitoring continues for signs of deterioration such as a decreasing level of consciousness.

Traumatic brain injury may cause a range of serious coincidental complications that include cardiac arrhythmias and neurogenic pulmonary edema. These conditions must be adequately treated and stabilised as part of the core care. Surgery can be performed on mass lesions or to eliminate objects that have penetrated the brain. Mass lesions such as contusions or hematomas causing a significant mass effect (shift of intracranial structures) are considered emergencies and are removed surgically. For intracranial hematomas, the collected blood may be removed using suction or forceps or it may be floated off with water. Surgeons look for hemorrhaging blood vessels and seek to control bleeding. In penetrating brain injury, damaged tissue is surgically debrided, and craniotomy may be needed. Craniotomy, in which part of the skull is removed, may be needed to remove pieces of fractured skull or objects embedded in the brain. Decompressive craniectomy (DC) is performed routinely in the very short period following TBI during operations to treat hematomas; part of the skull is removed temporarily (primary DC). DC performed hours or days after TBI in order to control persistently high intracranial pressures (secondary DC), although can reduce intracranial pressure and length of stay in ICU, but have worse Glasgow Coma Scale (GCS) scores, and high chances of death, vegetative state, or severe disability when compared to those receiving standard medical therapies.

=== Chronic stage ===
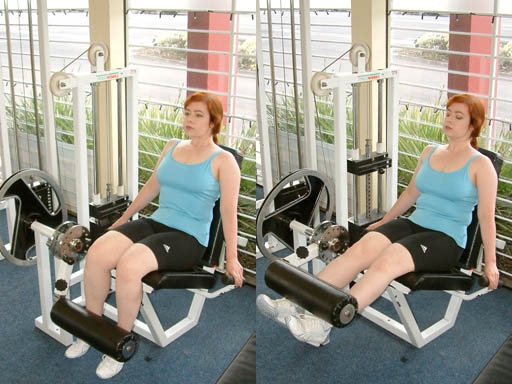
Physical therapy will commonly include muscle strength exercise.

Once medically stable, people may be transferred to a subacute rehabilitation unit of the medical center or to an independent rehabilitation hospital. Rehabilitation aims to improve independent functioning at home and in society, and to help adapt to disabilities. Rehabilitation has demonstrated its general effectiveness when conducted by a team of health professionals who specialize in head trauma. As for any person with neurologic deficits, a multidisciplinary approach is key to optimizing outcome. Physiatrists or neurologists are likely to be the key medical staff involved, but depending on the person, doctors of other medical specialties may also be helpful. Allied health professions such as physiotherapy, speech and language therapy, cognitive rehabilitation therapy, and occupational therapy will be essential to assess function and design the rehabilitation activities for each person. Treatment of neuropsychiatric symptoms such as emotional distress and clinical depression may involve mental health professionals such as therapists, psychologists, and psychiatrists, while neuropsychologists can help to evaluate and manage cognitive deficits. Social workers, rehabilitation support personnel, nutritionists, therapeutic recreationists, and pharmacists are also important members of the TBI rehabilitation team. After discharge from the inpatient rehabilitation treatment unit, care may be given on an outpatient basis. Community-based rehabilitation will be required for a high proportion of people, including vocational rehabilitation; this supportive employment matches job demands to the worker's abilities. People with TBI who cannot live independently or with family may require care in supported living facilities such as group homes. Respite care, including day centers and leisure facilities for disabled people, offers time off for caregivers, and activities for people with TBI.

Pharmacological treatment can help to manage psychiatric or behavioral problems. Medication is also used to control post-traumatic epilepsy; however the preventive use of anti-epileptics is not recommended. In those cases where the person is bedridden due to a reduction of consciousness, has to remain in a wheelchair because of mobility problems, or has any other problem heavily impacting self-caring capacities, caregiving and nursing are critical. The most effective research documented intervention approach is the activation database guided EEG biofeedback approach, which has shown significant improvements in memory abilities of the TBI subject that are far superior than traditional approaches (strategies, computers, medication intervention). Gains of 2.61 standard deviations have been documented. The TBI's auditory memory ability was superior to the control group after the treatment.

There is a promising technology called activation database-guided EEG biofeedback, which has been documented to return a TBI's auditory memory ability to above the control group's performance

=== Effect on the gait pattern ===
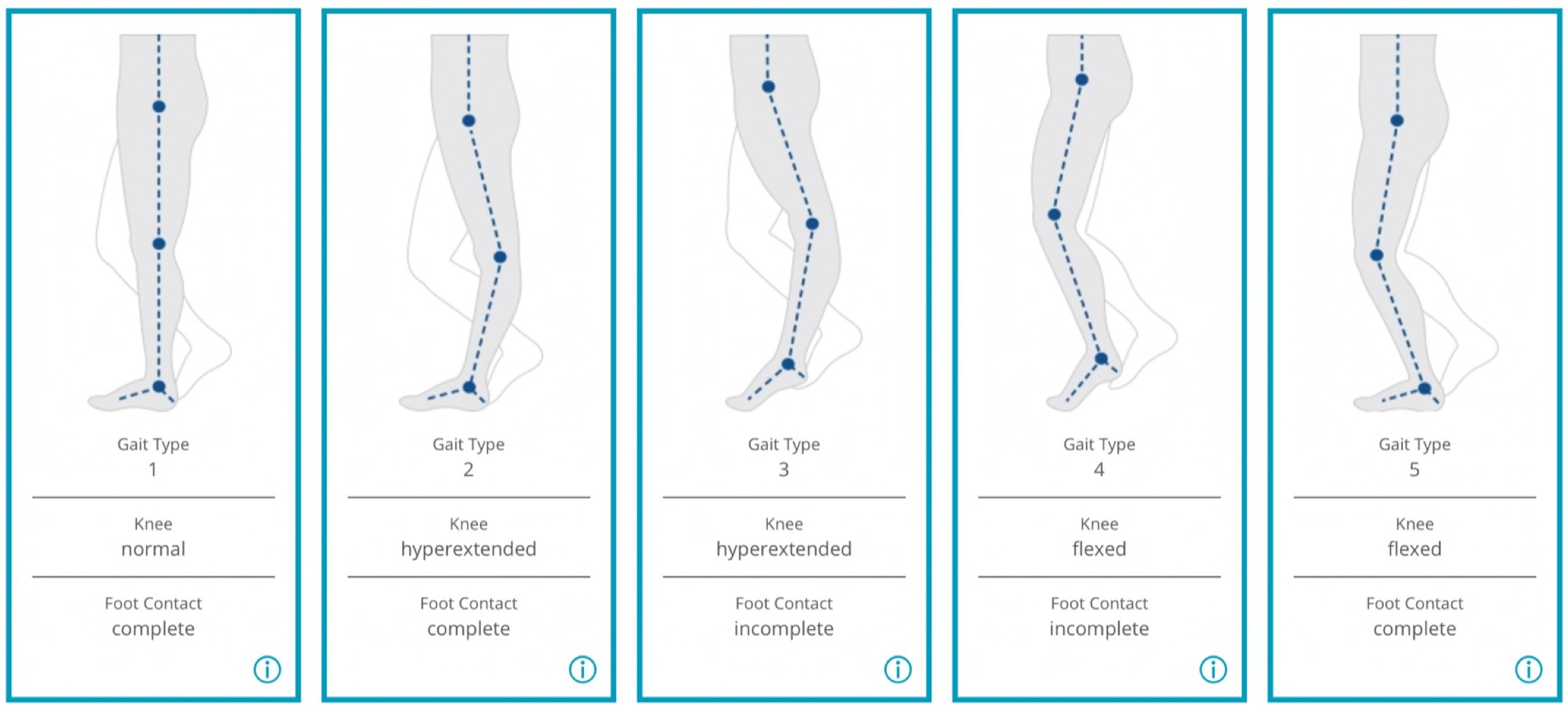
The Amsterdam Gait Classification facilitates the assessment of the gait pattern in patients after a traumatic brain injury. It helps to facilitate communication in the interdisciplinary team between those affected, doctors, physiotherapists and orthotists.

In patients who have developed paralysis of the legs in the form of spastic hemiplegia or diplegia as a result of the traumatic brain injury, various gait patterns can be observed, the exact extent of which can only be described with the help of complex gait analysis systems. In order to facilitate interdisciplinary communication in the interdisciplinary team between those affected, doctors, physiotherapists and orthotists, a simple description of the gait pattern is useful. J. Rodda and H. K. Graham already described in 2001 how gait patterns of CP patients can be more easily recognized and defined gait types which they compared in a classification. They also described that gait patterns can vary with age. Building on this, the Amsterdam Gait Classification was developed at the free university in Amsterdam, the VU medisch centrum. A special feature of this classification is that it makes different gait patterns very recognizable and can be used in patients in whom only one leg and both legs are affected. The Amsterdam Gait Classification was developed for viewing patients with cerebral palsy; however, it can be used just as well in patients with traumatic brain injuries. According to the Amsterdam Gait Classification, five gait types are described. To assess the gait pattern, the patient is viewed visually or via a video recording from the side of the leg to be assessed. At the point in time at which the leg to be viewed is in mid stance and the leg not to be viewed is in mid swing, the knee angle and the contact of the foot with the ground are assessed on the one hand.

Classification of the gait pattern according to the Amsterdam Gait Classification: In gait type 1, the knee angle is normal and the foot contact is complete. In gait type 2, the knee angle is hyperextended and the foot contact is complete. In gait type 3, the knee angle is hyperextended and foot contact is incomplete (only on the forefoot). In gait type 4, the knee angle is bent and foot contact is incomplete (only on the forefoot). With gait type 5, which is also known as crouch gait, the knee angle is bent and the foot contact is complete.

=== Orthotics ===
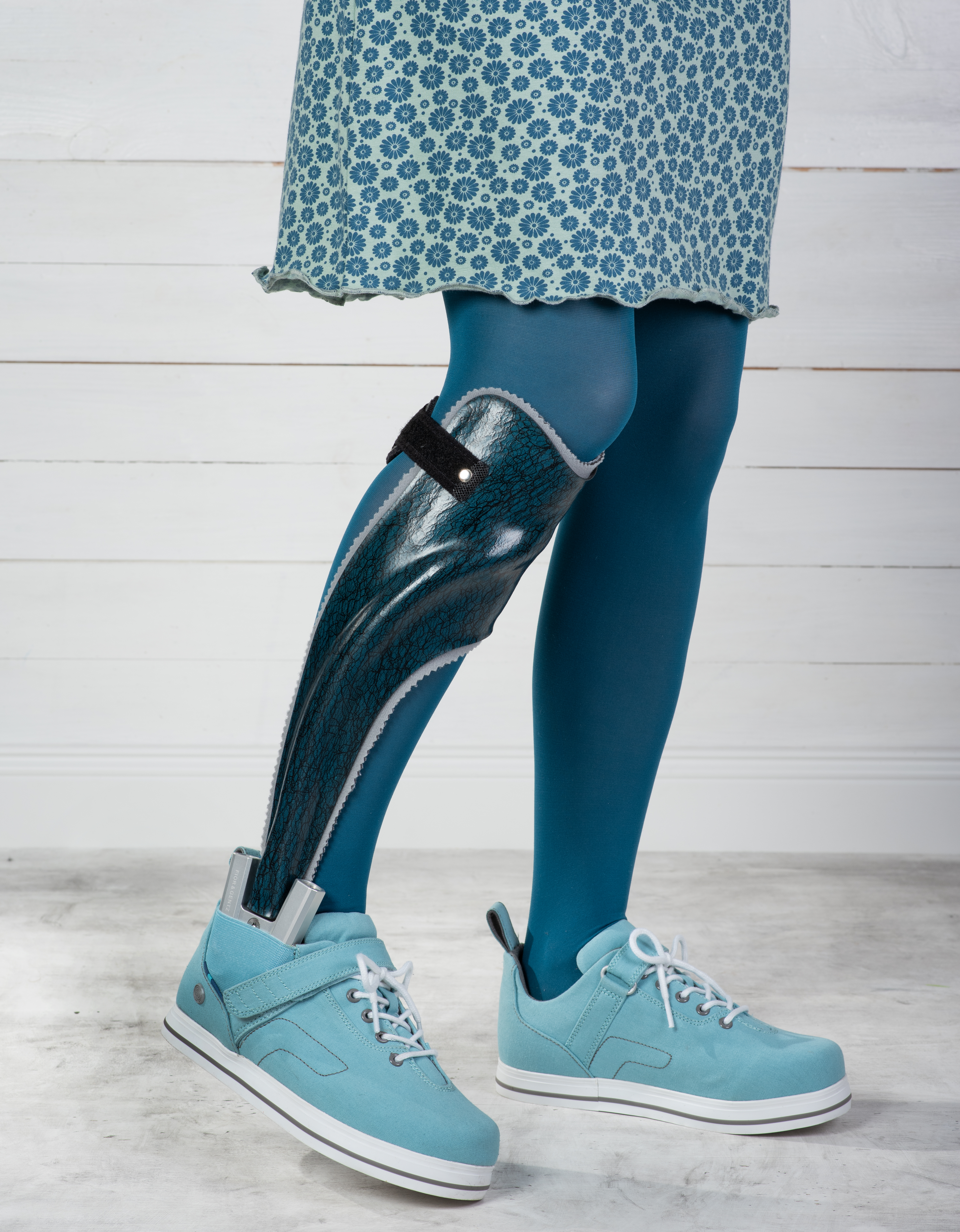
Ankle-foot orthosis with dynamic functional elements, whose adjustable spring resistances in plantar and dorsiflexion can be separately adapted to the patient's gait. The orthosis is used to improve safety when standing and walking. (Designation of the orthosis according to the body parts included in the orthosis fitting: ankle and foot, English abbreviation: AFO for ankle-foot orthoses)

To improve the gait pattern, orthotics can be included in the therapy concept. An orthosis can support physiotherapeutic treatment in setting the right motor impulses in order to create new cerebral connections. The orthosis must meet the requirements of the medical prescription. In addition, the orthosis must be designed by the orthotist in such a way that it achieves the effectiveness of the necessary levers, matching the gait pattern, in order to support the proprioceptive approaches of physiotherapy. The orthotic concepts of the treatment are based on the concepts for the patients with cerebral palsy. The characteristics of the stiffness of the orthosis shells and the adjustable dynamics in the ankle joint are important elements of the orthosis to be considered.

The orthotic concepts of the treatment are based on the concepts for the patients with cerebral palsy. Due to these requirements, the development of orthoses has changed significantly in recent years, especially since around 2010. At about the same time, care concepts were developed that deal intensively with the orthotic treatment of the lower extremities in cerebral palsy. Modern materials and new functional elements enable the rigidity to be specifically adapted to the requirements that fits to the gait pattern of the patient. The adjustment of the stiffness has a decisive influence on the gait pattern and on the energy cost of walking. It is of great advantage if the stiffness of the orthosis can be adjusted separately from one another via resistances of the two functional elements in the two directions of movement, dorsiflexion and plantar flexion.

== Prognosis ==
Prognosis worsens with the severity of injury. Most TBIs are mild and do not cause permanent or long-term disability; however, all severity levels of TBI have the potential to cause significant, long-lasting disability. Permanent disability is thought to occur in 10% of mild injuries, 66% of moderate injuries, and 100% of severe injuries. Most mild TBI is completely resolved within three weeks. Almost all people with mild TBI are able to live independently and return to the jobs they had before the injury, although a small portion have mild cognitive and social impairments. Over 90% of people with moderate TBI are able to live independently, although some require assistance in areas such as physical abilities, employment, and financial managing. Most people with severe closed head injury either die or recover enough to live independently; middle ground is less common. Coma, as it is closely related to severity, is a strong predictor of poor outcome.

Prognosis differs depending on the severity and location of the lesion, and access to immediate, specialised acute management. Subarachnoid hemorrhage approximately doubles mortality. Subdural hematoma is associated with worse outcome and increased mortality, while people with epidural hematoma are expected to have a good outcome if they receive surgery quickly. Diffuse axonal injury may be associated with coma when severe, and poor outcome. Following the acute stage, prognosis is strongly influenced by the patient's involvement in activity that promote recovery, which for most patients requires access to a specialised, intensive rehabilitation service. The Functional Independence Measure is a way to track progress and degree of independence throughout rehabilitation.

Medical complications are associated with a bad prognosis. Examples of such complications include: hypotension (low blood pressure), hypoxia (low blood oxygen saturation), lower cerebral perfusion pressures, and longer times spent with high intracranial pressures. Patient characteristics also influence prognosis. Examples of factors thought to worsen it include: abuse of substances such as illicit drugs and alcohol and age over sixty or under two years (in children, younger age at time of injury may be associated with a slower recovery of some abilities). Other influences that may affect recovery include pre-injury intellectual ability, coping strategies, personality traits, family environment, social support systems and financial circumstances.

Life satisfaction has been known to decrease for individuals with TBI immediately following the trauma, but evidence has shown that life roles, age, and depressive symptoms influence the trajectory of life satisfaction as time passes. Many people with traumatic brain injuries have poor physical fitness following their acute injury and this may result with difficulties in day-to-day activities and increased levels of fatigue.

== Complications ==
The relative risk of post-traumatic seizures (PTS) increases with the severity of traumatic brain injury (TBI).

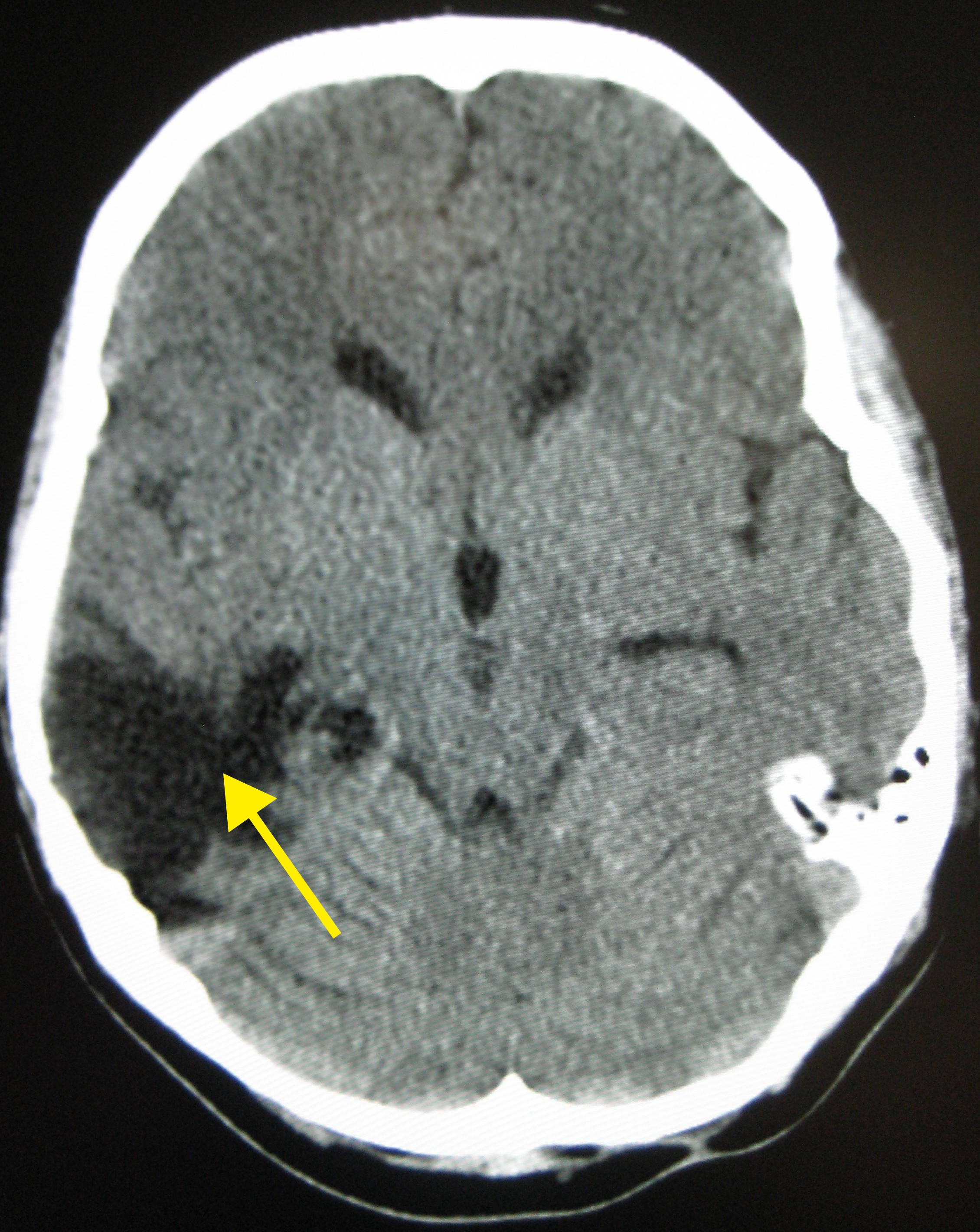
A CT of the head years after a traumatic brain injury showing an empty space where the damage occurred marked by the arrow

Improvement of neurological function usually occurs for two or more years after the trauma. For many years it was believed that recovery was fastest during the first six months, but there is no evidence to support this. It may be related to services commonly being withdrawn after this period, rather than any physiological limitation to further progress. Children recover better in the immediate time frame and improve for longer periods.

Complications are distinct medical problems that may arise as a result of the TBI. The results of traumatic brain injury vary widely in type and duration; they include physical, cognitive, emotional, and behavioral complications. TBI can cause prolonged or permanent effects on consciousness, such as coma, brain death, persistent vegetative state (in which patients are unable to achieve a state of alertness to interact with their surroundings), and minimally conscious state (in which patients show minimal signs of being aware of self or environment). Lying still for long periods can cause complications including pressure sores, pneumonia or other infections, progressive multiple organ failure, and deep venous thrombosis, which can cause pulmonary embolism. Infections that can follow skull fractures and penetrating injuries include meningitis and abscesses. Complications involving the blood vessels include vasospasm, in which vessels constrict and restrict blood flow, the formation of aneurysms, in which the side of a vessel weakens and balloons out, and stroke.

Movement disorders that may develop after TBI include tremor, ataxia (uncoordinated muscle movements), spasticity (muscle contractions are overactive), myoclonus (shock-like contractions of muscles), and loss of movement range and control (in particular with a loss of movement repertoire). The risk of post-traumatic seizures increases with severity of trauma and is particularly elevated with certain types of brain trauma such as cerebral contusions or hematomas. People with early seizures, those occurring within a week of injury, have an increased risk of post-traumatic epilepsy (recurrent seizures occurring more than a week after the initial trauma). People may lose or experience altered vision, hearing, or smell.

Hormonal disturbances may occur secondary to hypopituitarism, occurring immediately or years after injury in 10 to 15% of TBI patients. Development of diabetes insipidus or an electrolyte abnormality acutely after injury indicate need for endocrinologic work up. Signs and symptoms of hypopituitarism may develop and be screened for in adults with moderate TBI and in mild TBI with imaging abnormalities. Children with moderate to severe head injury may also develop hypopituitarism. Screening should take place 3 to 6 months, and 12 months after injury, but problems may occur more remotely.

Cognitive deficits that can follow TBI include impaired attention; disrupted insight, judgement, and thought; reduced processing speed; distractibility; and deficits in executive functions such as abstract reasoning, planning, problem-solving, and multitasking. Memory loss, the most common cognitive impairment among head-injured people, occurs in 20–79% of people with closed head trauma, depending on severity. People who have had TBI may also have difficulty with understanding or producing spoken or written language, or with more subtle aspects of communication such as body language. Post-concussion syndrome, a set of lasting symptoms experienced after mild TBI, can include physical, cognitive, emotional and behavioral problems such as headaches, dizziness, difficulty concentrating, and depression. Multiple TBIs may have a cumulative effect. A young person who receives a second concussion before symptoms from another one have healed may be at risk for developing a very rare but deadly condition called second-impact syndrome, in which the brain swells catastrophically after even a mild blow, with debilitating or deadly results. About one in five professional boxers is affected by the severe form of chronic traumatic encephalopathy (CTE), which causes cognitive, behavioral, and physical impairments that can present as dementia, and the tremors and lack of coordination of parkinsonism. CTE primarily affects boxers years after their career has ended.

TBI may cause emotional, social, or behavioral problems and changes in personality. These may include emotional instability, depression, anxiety, hypomania, mania, apathy, irritability, problems with social judgment, and impaired conversational skills. TBI appears to predispose survivors to psychiatric disorders including obsessive compulsive disorder, substance abuse, dysthymia, clinical depression, bipolar disorder, and anxiety disorders. In patients who have depression after TBI, suicidal ideation is not uncommon; the suicide rate among these persons is increased 2- to 3-fold. Social and behavioral symptoms that can follow TBI include disinhibition, inability to control anger, impulsiveness, lack of initiative, inappropriate sexual activity, asociality and social withdrawal, and changes in personality.

TBI also has a substantial impact on the functioning of family systems. Caregiving family members and TBI survivors often significantly alter their familial roles and responsibilities following injury, creating significant change and strain on a family system. Typical challenges identified by families recovering from TBI include: frustration and impatience with one another, loss of former lives and relationships, difficulty setting reasonable goals, inability to effectively solve problems as a family, increased level of stress and household tension, changes in emotional dynamics, and overwhelming desire to return to pre-injury status. In addition, families may exhibit less effective functioning in areas including coping, problem solving and communication. Psychoeducation and counseling models have been demonstrated to be effective in minimizing family disruption.

== Epidemiology ==
Causes of TBI fatalities in the US

TBI is a leading cause of death and disability around the globe and presents a major worldwide social, economic, and health problem. It is the number one cause of coma, it plays the leading role in disability due to trauma, and is the leading cause of brain damage in children and young adults. In Europe it is responsible for more years of disability than any other cause. It also plays a significant role in half of trauma deaths.

Findings on the frequency of each level of severity vary based on the definitions and methods used in studies. A World Health Organization study estimated that between 70 and 90% of head injuries that receive treatment are mild, and a US study found that moderate and severe injuries each account for 10% of TBIs, with the rest mild.

The incidence of TBI varies by age, gender, region and other factors. Findings of incidence and prevalence in epidemiological studies vary based on such factors as which grades of severity are included, whether deaths are included, whether the study is restricted to hospitalized people, and the study's location. The annual incidence of mild TBI is difficult to determine but may be 100–600 people per 100,000.

=== Mortality ===
In the US, the case fatality rate is estimated to be 21% by 30 days after TBI. A study on Iraq War soldiers found that severe TBI carries a mortality of 30–50%. Deaths have declined due to improved treatments and systems for managing trauma in societies wealthy enough to provide modern emergency and neurosurgical services. The fraction of those who die after being hospitalized with TBI fell from almost half in the 1970s to about a quarter at the beginning of the 21st century. This decline in mortality has led to a concomitant increase in the number of people living with disabilities that result from TBI.

Biological, clinical, and demographic factors contribute to the likelihood that an injury will be fatal. In addition, outcome depends heavily on the cause of head injury. In the US, patients with fall-related TBIs have an 89% survival rate, while only 9% of patients with firearm-related TBIs survive. In the US, firearms are the most common cause of fatal TBI, followed by vehicle accidents and then falls. Of deaths from firearms, 75% are considered to be suicides.

The incidence of TBI is increasing globally, due largely to an increase in motor vehicle use in low- and middle-income countries. In developing countries, automobile use has increased faster than safety infrastructure could be introduced. In contrast, vehicle safety laws have decreased rates of TBI in high-income countries, which have seen decreases in traffic-related TBI since the 1970s. Each year in the United States, about two million people have a TBI, approximately 675,000 injuries are seen in the emergency department, and about 500,000 patients are hospitalized. The yearly incidence of TBI is estimated at 180–250 per 100,000 people in the US, 281 per 100,000 in France, 361 per 100,000 in South Africa, 322 per 100,000 in Australia, and 430 per 100,000 in England. In the European Union the yearly aggregate incidence of TBI hospitalizations and fatalities is estimated at 235 per 100,000.

=== Demographics ===
TBI is present in 85% of traumatically injured children, either alone or with other injuries. A great number of TBIs occur in people aged 15–24. Because TBI is common in young people, its costs to society are high due to the loss of productive years to death and disability. The age groups most at risk for TBI are children ages five to nine and adults over age 80, and the highest rates of death and hospitalization due to TBI are in people over age 65. The incidence of fall-related TBI in First-World countries is increasing as the population ages; thus the median age of people with head injuries has increased. Data from 2021-2025 from the CDC shows that people age 75 years and older had the greatest number of deaths and hospitalizations related to TBI.

Regardless of age, TBI rates are higher in males. Men have twice as many TBIs as women do and have a fourfold risk of fatal head injury, and males account for two thirds of childhood and adolescent head trauma; however, when matched for severity of injury, women appear to fare more poorly than men.

Socioeconomic status also appears to affect TBI rates; people with lower levels of education and employment and lower socioeconomic status are at greater risk. Approximately half of those incarcerated in prisons and jails in the United States have had TBIs.

== History ==
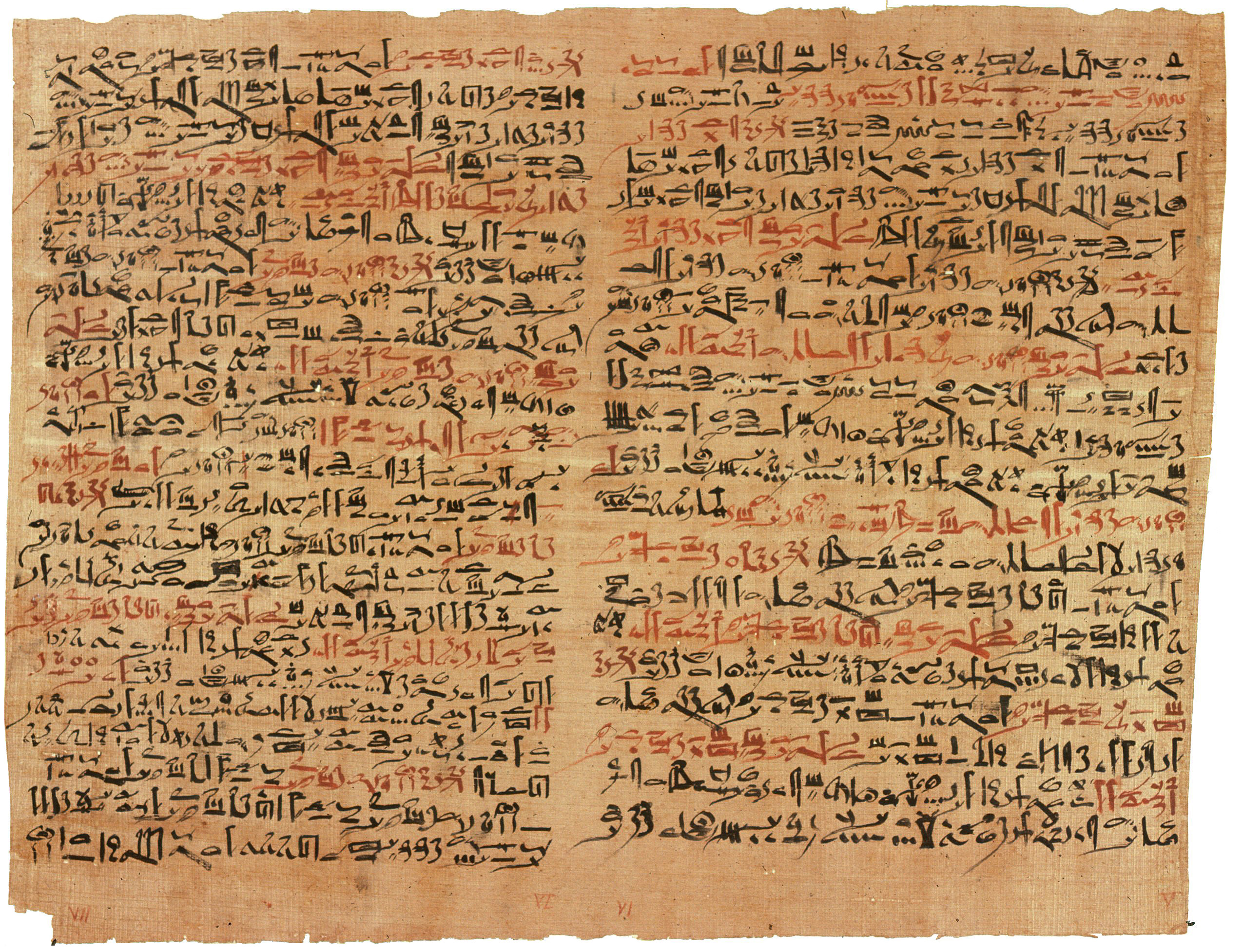
The Edwin Smith Papyrus

Head injury is present in ancient myths that may date back before recorded history. Skulls found in battleground graves with holes drilled over fracture lines suggest that trepanation may have been used to treat TBI in ancient times. Ancient Mesopotamians knew of head injury and some of its effects, including seizures, paralysis, and loss of sight, hearing or speech. The Edwin Smith Papyrus, written around 1650–1550 BC, describes various head injuries and symptoms and classifies them based on their presentation and tractability. Ancient Greek physicians including Hippocrates understood the brain to be the center of thought, probably due to their experience observing the effects of head trauma.

Medieval and Renaissance surgeons continued the practice of trepanation for head injury. In the Middle Ages, physicians further described head injury symptoms and the term concussion became more widespread. Concussion symptoms were first described systematically in the 16th century by Berengario da Carpi.

It was first suggested in the 18th century that intracranial pressure rather than skull damage was the cause of pathology after TBI. This hypothesis was confirmed around the end of the 19th century, and opening the skull to relieve pressure was then proposed as a treatment.

In the 19th century it was noted that TBI is related to the development of psychosis. At that time a debate arose around whether post-concussion syndrome was due to a disturbance of the brain tissue or psychological factors. The debate continues today.

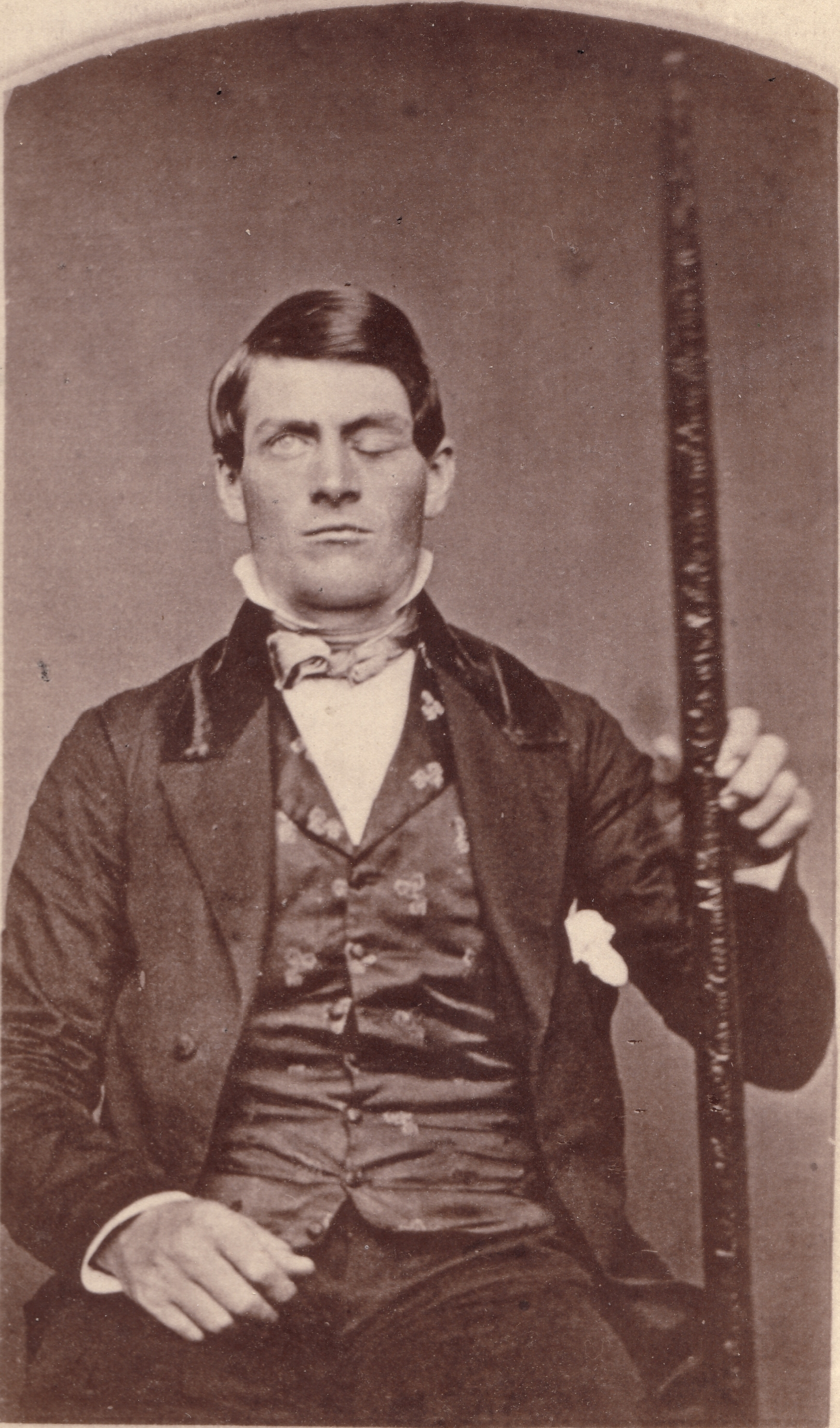
Phineas Gage with the tamping iron that entered his left cheek and emerged at the top of his head

Perhaps the first reported case of personality change after brain injury is that of Phineas Gage, who survived an accident in which a large iron rod was driven through his head, destroying one or both of his frontal lobes; numerous cases of personality change after brain injury have been reported since.

The 20th century saw the advancement of technologies that improved treatment and diagnosis such as the development of imaging tools including CT and MRI, and, in the 21st century, diffusion tensor imaging (DTI). The introduction of intracranial pressure monitoring in the 1950s has been credited with beginning the "modern era" of head injury. Until the 20th century, the mortality rate of TBI was high and rehabilitation was uncommon; improvements in care made during World War I reduced the death rate and made rehabilitation possible. Facilities dedicated to TBI rehabilitation were probably first established during World War I. Explosives used in World War I caused many blast injuries; the large number of TBIs that resulted allowed researchers to learn about localization of brain functions. Blast-related injuries are now common problems in returning veterans from Iraq & Afghanistan; research shows that the symptoms of such TBIs are largely the same as those of TBIs involving a physical blow to the head.

In the 1970s, awareness of TBI as a public health problem grew, and a great deal of progress has been made since then in brain trauma research, such as the discovery of primary and secondary brain injury. The 1990s saw the development and dissemination of standardized guidelines for treatment of TBI, with protocols for a range of issues such as drugs and management of intracranial pressure. Research since the early 1990s has improved TBI survival; that decade was known as the "Decade of the Brain" for advances made in brain research.

== Research directions ==
=== Diagnosis ===
Quantitative EEG and EEG, which has no specific patterns in TBI is used in research settings to differentiate between mild TBI and no TBI.

=== Medications ===
As of 2008, no medication is approved to halt the progression of the initial injury to secondary injury. The variety of pathological events presents opportunities to find treatments that interfere with the damage processes.

Further research is necessary to determine if the vasoconstrictor indomethacin (indometacin) can be used to treat increased pressure in the skull following a TBI. In addition, drugs such as NMDA receptor antagonists to halt neurochemical cascades such as excitotoxicity showed promise in animal trials but failed in clinical trials. These failures could be due to factors including faults in the trial designs or in the insufficiency of a single agent to prevent the array of injury processes involved in secondary injury. Other topics of research have included investigations into mannitol, dexamethasone, barbiturates, magnesium (no strong evidence), and calcium channel blockers.

A 2024 review reported inconsistent findings regarding the potential of amphetamine and methylphenidate to improve cognitive and motor function following stroke and TBI, noting that further research was required to understand the treatment time window.

=== Procedures ===
Although neuroprotection methods to decrease secondary injury have been the subject of interest follows TBI, trials to test agents that could halt these cellular mechanisms have met largely with failure as of 2008. For example, interest existed in cooling the injured brain; however, a 2020 Cochrane review did not find enough evidence to see if it was useful or not. Maintaining a normal temperature in the immediate period after a TBI appeared useful. One review found a lower than normal temperature was useful in adults but not children. While two other reviews found it did not appear to be useful. In addition to traditional imaging modalities, there are several devices that help to monitor brain injury and facilitate research. Microdialysis allows ongoing sampling of extracellular fluid for analysis of metabolites that might indicate ischemia or brain metabolism, such as glucose, glycerol, and glutamate. Intraparenchymal brain tissue oxygen monitoring systems (either Licox or Neurovent-PTO) are used routinely in neurointensive care in the US. A non invasive model called CerOx is in development.

Research is also planned to clarify factors correlated to outcome in TBI and to determine in which cases it is best to perform CT scans and surgical procedures.

Hyperbaric oxygen therapy (HBO) has been evaluated as an add on treatment following TBI. The findings of a 2012 Cochrane systematic review does not justify the routine use of hyperbaric oxygen therapy to treat people recovering from a traumatic brain injury. This review also reported that only a small number of randomized controlled trials had been conducted at the time of the review, many of which had methodological problems and poor reporting. HBO for TBI is controversial with further evidence required to determine if it has a role.

=== Psychological ===
Further research is required to determine the effectiveness of non-pharmacological treatment approaches for treating depression in children/adolescents and adults with TBI.

As of 2010, the use of predictive visual tracking measurement to identify mild traumatic brain injury was being studied. In visual tracking tests, a head-mounted display unit with eye-tracking capability shows an object moving in a regular pattern. People without brain injury are able to track the moving object with smooth pursuit eye movements and correct trajectory. The test requires both attention and working memory which are difficult functions for people with mild traumatic brain injury. The question being studied, is whether results for people with brain injury will show visual-tracking gaze errors relative to the moving target.

=== Monitoring pressure ===
Pressure reactivity index is used to correlate intracranial pressure with arterial blood pressure to give information about the state of cerebral perfusion, thus guiding treatment and prevent excessively high or low blood flow to the brain. However, such method of monitoring intracranial pressure of equal or less than 20 mmHg is no better than imaging and clinical examination that monitor the neurological status of the brain in prolonging the survival, preserving the mental or functional status of the subject.

=== Sensory processing ===
In animal models of TBI, sensory processing has been widely studied to show systematic defects arise and are slowly but likely only partially recovered. It is especially characterised by an initial period of decreased activity in upper cortical layers. This period of decreased activity has also been characterised as by specific timing effects in the patterns of cortical activity in these upper layers in response to regular sensory stimuli.

== Cited texts ==
- Boake C, Diller L (2005). "History of rehabilitation for traumatic brain injury". In High WM, Sander AM, Struchen MA, Hart KA (eds.). Rehabilitation for Traumatic Brain Injury. Oxford [Oxfordshire]: Oxford University Press. ISBN 978-0-19-517355-0.
- Granacher RA (2007). Traumatic Brain Injury: Methods for Clinical & Forensic Neuropsychiatric Assessment, Second Edition. Boca Raton: CRC. ISBN 978-0-8493-8138-6.
- LaPlaca MC, Simon CM, Prado GR, Cullen DR (2007). "CNS injury biomechanics and experimental models". In Weber JT (ed.). Neurotrauma: New Insights Into Pathology and Treatment. Amsterdam: Academic Press. ISBN 978-0-444-53017-2.
- Marion DW (1999). "Introduction". In Marion DW (ed.). Traumatic Brain Injury. Stuttgart: Thieme. ISBN 978-0-86577-727-9.

The original version of this article contained text from the NINDS public domain pages on TBI
