= Mass effect (disambiguation) =

Mass Effect is a series of action role-playing video games.

Mass effect may also refer to:

- Mass effect (medicine), the effect of a growing mass or tumor
- Mass Effect (video game), the first game in the series
