= Adynamia =

Pathological lack of strength

Adynamia means lack of strength or vigor due to a pathological condition. It is often associated with a range of neurological diseases such as multiple sclerosis and medial-frontal lobe lesions. It may be episodical, hereditary, or periodic (all types are ICD-10-CM code G72.3).
