= Mass effect (medicine) =

Pressure and/or displacement of adjacent tissues that results from growth of a mass

In medicine, a mass effect is the effect of a growing mass that results in secondary pathological effects by pushing on or displacing surrounding tissue.

In oncology, the mass typically refers to a tumor.

For example, cancer of the thyroid gland may cause symptoms due to compressions of certain structures of the head and neck; pressure on the laryngeal nerves may cause voice changes, narrowing of the windpipe may cause stridor, pressure on the gullet may cause dysphagia and so on. Surgical removal or debulking is sometimes used to palliate symptoms of the mass effect even if the underlying pathology is not curable.

In neurology, a mass effect is the effect exerted by any mass, including, for example, hydrocephalus (cerebrospinal fluid buildup) or an evolving intracranial hemorrhage (bleeding within the skull) presenting with a clinically significant hematoma. The hematoma can exert a mass effect on the brain, increasing intracranial pressure and potentially causing midline shift or deadly brain herniation. In the past this effect held additional diagnostic importance since prior to the invention of modern tomographic soft-tissue imaging utilizing MRI or CT it was not possible to directly image many kinds of primary intracranial lesions. Therefore, in those days, the mass effect of these abnormalities on surrounding structures was sometimes used to indirectly infer the existence of the primary abnormalities themselves, for example by using a cerebral angiography to observe the secondary vascular displacement caused by a subdural hematoma pushing on the brain, or by looking for a distortion caused by a tumor on the normal outline of the ventricles as depicted on a pneumoencephalogram. These studies were often invasive and uncomfortable for patients and provided only a partial assessment of the primary condition being evaluated. Nowadays modern diagnostic tools exist which allow physicians to easily locate and visualize all kinds of intracranial lesions without having to rely on indirect effects to make a reliable diagnosis.
