= Baby Shaker =

2009 video game

- A screenshot of Baby Shaker in which the baby has been killed after 6.4 seconds
- Original author: Alex Talbot
- Developer: Sikalosoft
- Release: April 2009; 17 years ago
- Operating system: iOS
- Platform: iPhone
- Available in: English
- Type: Non-game

Baby Shaker was a controversial mobile game that was available on the Apple App Store for two days in April 2009. Developed by Sikalosoft, the game tasks players with either rocking or shaking their iPhone for as long as possible to quiet a crying baby; by shaking it, the baby dies. The app received negative attention from parents and online child protection groups, who accused it of promoting shaken baby syndrome and infanticide.

== Description ==
Baby Shaker was developed in 2009 by Sikalosoft, which, according to The Guardian, was operated by a programmer named Alex Talbot. The game was approved for the App Store later that year by a team led by Phillip Shoemaker, an Apple employee who was in charge of iOS app approvals. The game was sold for US$0.99 (equivalent to $1.49 in 2025).

In Baby Shaker, a timer counts from zero and the sounds of a baby crying are heard over a black-and-white illustration of a baby. Players must calm the baby: they can rock their iPhone back and forth like they are cradling the baby, or shake it, which results in two red Xs appearing over the baby's eyes, symbolizing the baby's death. After the baby stops crying, the user is asked if they would like to play again. The goal of the game is to endure the baby's cries for as long as possible.

On a plane, on the bus, in a theater. Babies are everywhere you don't want them to be! They're always distracting you from preparing for that big presentation at work with their incessant crying. Before Baby Shaker there was nothing you could do about it.

— Baby Shaker's application description.

Baby Shaker received negative feedback from both parents and child protection groups, accusing the game of mocking and promoting shaken baby syndrome and infanticide, despite the game's description warning to "Never, never shake a baby". Patrick Donohue, the founder of the Sarah Jane Brain Foundation, filed a complaint to Steve Jobs, stating "words cannot describe [his] reaction." According to Shoemaker, protests occurred outside the Apple Infinite Loop campus, and he admitted that the app's approval was a mistake on his end. Baby Shaker was removed from the App Store on April 22, 2009, two days after its release. Apple then issued an apology for approving the app, calling it "deeply offensive", but RTVE criticized Apple for not explaining why the app was approved, and Daniel Lonescu of ABC News said that Apple has banned less offensive apps, such as one about South Park. Sikalosoft has not responded since Baby Shaker was pulled from the App Store.

== See also ==
- I Am Rich – a notably expensive 2008 iPhone application
- Send Me to Heaven – an Android application known for encouraging risky behavior
