= Josh Begley =

Josh Begley may refer to:

- Josh Begley (artist) (born 1984), American digital artist
- Josh Begley (footballer) (born 1998), Australian rules footballer
