= Mohammed Ghanbari =

Iranian engineer

Mohammed Ghanbari (Persian: محمد قنبری; 1948–2024) was an emeritus professor in the Department of Electronic Systems Engineering focused in the areas of Video Networking at the University of Essex.

He graduated from Aryamehr University of Technology in Tehran, Iran, with a BSc degree in electrical engineering in 1970, an MSc in telecommunications, and a PhD in electronics from the University of Essex, England in 1976 and 1979 respectively. After ten years of work in radio and television broadcasting, he started his academic career in 1986 as a research fellow working on video coding for Packet Networks. He was then appointed as a lecturer at the Department of Electronic Systems Engineering at Essex in 1988 and promoted to senior lecturer then reader in 1993 and 1995, respectively. He was appointed a personal chair in 1996.

He is best known for his pioneering work on two-layer video coding for ATM networks (which earned him IEEE Fellowship in 2001), now is known as SNR scalability in the standard video codecs. He has registered for eleven international patents on various aspects of video networking. Mohammed was the co-recipient of A.H. Reeves prize for the best paper published in the 1995 proceedings of IEE in the theme of digital coding.

He has been an organizing member of several international conferences and workshops. He was the general chair of the 1997 international workshop on packet video and guest editor to 1997 IEEE Transactions on circuits and systems for Video Technology, Special issue on Multimedia technology and applications. He has been an associate editor to IEEE Transactions on Multimedia (IEEE-T-MM) and represented University of Essex as one of the six academic partners in the Virtual Centre of Excellence in Digital Broadcasting and Multimedia. He is a Life Fellow of IEEE, Fellow of IEE and Charted Engineer (CEng).

Mohammad Ghanbari died in 2024 at the age of 75.

== Bibliography ==
- Ghanbari, Mohammed (1997). Principles of Performance Engineering for Telecommunication and Information Systems (1st ed.). London: Institution of Engineering & Technology. ISBN 978-0-86341-639-2.
- Ghanbari, M. (2011). Standard Codecs: Image Compression to Advanced Video Coding (3rd ed.). London: Institution of Engineering & Technology. ISBN 978-0-86341-964-5.
