= SMTH =

SMTH may refer to:

- Send Me To Heaven, a mobile game available from Google Play
- Tsinghua University, a university located in Beijing with specialism in engineering disciplines
- SMTH BBS, an influential bulletin board system in China hosted by Tsinghua University
