= Robert Roberson case =

Texas death row inmate convicted of murdering his daughter in 2002

Robert Roberson
- Undated photo of Robert Roberson
- Born: Robert Roberson III; November 10, 1966 (age 59); Wood County, Texas, U.S.
- Conviction: Capital murder
- Penalty: Death

Details
- Date: January 31, 2002
- Location: Anderson County, Texas
- Imprisoned at: Allan B. Polunsky Unit

Robert Leslie Roberson III (born November 10, 1966) is an American man on death row for the murder of his two-year-old daughter in 2002. Roberson, who had custody of his daughter, was accused of severely assaulting and shaking her to death, and was subsequently tried and convicted of capital murder and sentenced to death in 2003. He has lost his appeals since. The execution, which had been scheduled for October 17, 2024, was rescheduled for October 16, 2025. On October 9, 2025, the Texas Court of Criminal Appeals issued an emergency stay of execution.

Roberson's conviction is based on shaken baby syndrome. At trial, prosecutors argued that Roberson's alleged shaking of his daughter had likely contributed to her death as suggested by the shaken baby syndrome theory. Some have argued that the use of the shaken baby syndrome by prosecutors was "junk science", leading to controversy over the conviction. Since the conviction, Roberson's lawyers argued that his daughter had suffered from pneumonia, which had progressed into sepsis by the time of her death, and unsuccessfully appealed under Texas's "junk science law" as a defense. Beyond the use of shaken baby syndrome, prosecutors had amassed evidence showing his daughter had suffered a variety of serious injuries that are indicative of abuse, and could lead to death.

The Texas Supreme Court had upheld a temporary injunction to allow his testimony before the Texas House Committee on Criminal Jurisprudence. The Court later held that legislative committees cannot issue subpoenas with the intent to interfere with a prisoner's execution date, since execution dates are issued through judicial orders, and a new execution date has since been requested for Roberson. Ultimately, the committee never heard Roberson's testimony, but others testified, including Roberson's attorney and a juror who supported Roberson in his testimony.

== Background ==
Robert Leslie Roberson III was born on November 10, 1966, in Wood County, Texas. Official records showed that between 1991 and 1999, Roberson was convicted of burglary, theft and parole violations; he was released from prison in 2000. Prior to 2002, Roberson was divorced with two children, and he also fathered a daughter with another woman, who was reputedly a habitual drug abuser and sex worker. The girl, Nikki Michelle Curtis, was born on October 20, 1999, and entrusted to the care of her maternal grandparents; Roberson was granted custody of Nikki after he underwent DNA testing, which confirmed that he was the biological father of Nikki. Nikki was said to have had several chronic health problems soon after her birth.

== Daughter's death and murder trial ==
On January 31, 2002, two years after the end of his most recent time in prison, Roberson brought an injured Nikki to the hospital. He stated to hospital authorities that his daughter had fallen from her bed and sustained head injuries and was unconscious and not breathing when he awoke and found her. In spite of medical treatment, two-year-old Nikki Curtis was later pronounced dead after attempts to revive her failed. The doctors and nurses did not believe that the injuries were caused by a fall and suspected they could have been caused by child abuse. Moreover, doctors and investigators reported that they observed unusual behavior from Roberson as he reported his daughter's injuries. Therefore, a police report was launched, and Roberson was arrested the following day after his daughter's death. He was charged with murder, an offense that carries either life imprisonment or the death penalty under Texas state law.

At trial, the prosecution argued that Roberson intentionally murdered Nikki by means of lethal head injuries through severe abuse. During the court trial, medical experts theorized that Nikki's death was, in part, caused by "shaken baby syndrome", which involves the violent shaking of an infant resulting in severe head injuries. Roberson denied that he inflicted the fatal injuries to Nikki, although testimony given at trial suggested that Roberson had abused his ex-wife and two older children in the past. Additionally, Roberson's ex-wife testified that he choked and punched her when she was pregnant. The defense suggested that Roberson's ex-wife and Nikki's mother was an unreliable witness. They believed she had motivation to lie, having lost custody of their two children years prior in a drawn-out court battle, noting that she was flown in from Alabama to testify. Multiple witnesses, all related to Teddie Cox, Roberson's girlfriend at the time of Nikki's death, testified that they had seen Roberson shake Nikki on prior occasions. The defense argued that they too were unreliable; Teddie Cox in particular had admitted that she changed her story several times "depending on how I feel at the moment", while her children were aged 9 and 10 and had been told by their mother that Roberson killed Nikki, which could have produced an adverse bias against him.

According to prosecutors, physicians reported that Nikki suffered and ultimately died of "massive head trauma". Prosecutors argued that in the autopsy, Nikki was found to have "a bruise on the back of her shoulder, a scraped elbow, a bruise over her right eyebrow, bruises on her chin, a bruise on her left cheek, an abrasion next to her left eye, multiple bruises on the back of her head, a torn frenulum in her mouth, bruising on the inner surface of the lower lip, subscapular and subgaleal hemorrhaging between her skin and her skull, subarachnoid bleeding, subdural hematoma, both pre-retinal and retinal hemorrhages and brain edema."

Appeals filed by the Innocence Project criticized those statements made by the state's briefing of Attorney General Paxton's Office. According to the Innocence Project's appeals, these findings were made by the medical examiner days after Nikki had been brought to the hospital and had undergone extensive medical procedures to try to save her life, including repeated intubation and having a pressure monitor surgically screwed into the top of her head. The latter purportedly caused bruising and intracranial bleeding not present when Nikki was first brought in by her father for treatment, which was said to be proven by photos taken by a nurse and CT scans, which Roberson's attorneys and supporters reported to have been locked up for years in the courthouse basement. None of these alleged facts were shared with Roberson's jury, who was instead told that the site from the pressure monitor placed by the hospital was an "impact site". Additionally, only one doctor testified that Nikki had "multiple blows to different points on the head"; this was the medical examiner who performed the autopsy the morning after Nikki was removed from life support without consulting any of the child's medical records, including those from her multiple trips to the hospital and doctor the days before her collapse. The medical examiner did not account in her autopsy report or trial testimony for the effect of the child's medical condition or medical treatment. This position was contrary to his statements from the time he brought his daughter to the hospital for care until today. On February 21, 2003, Roberson was convicted of capital murder and sentenced to death by an Anderson County jury. Roberson filed an appeal to the Texas Court of Criminal Appeals but the appeal was dismissed on July 22, 2007. Another two appeals were rejected in May and August 2015, respectively, by the U.S. 5th Circuit Court of Appeals.

== Post-conviction controversy and 2016 execution stay ==
Roberson's conviction began to garner attention as "shaken baby syndrome", a significant basis of the case against Roberson, has become increasingly controversial, with critics labeling it junk science. Most researchers in the field do believe that some patterns of injury are suggestive of abuse which may at least partially be the result of shaking, but warn that doctors and certainly juries should be extremely cautious before relying upon such a diagnosis. In addition, Roberson's lawyers argued that the medical experts at trial had failed to consider alternative explanations behind the cause of death, or taken into account the chronic health conditions which Nikki suffered prior to her death. Among the new evidence submitted was that Nikki had suffered from pneumonia, which in turn had developed into undiagnosed sepsis. Roberson's defense argued that it was the pneumonia-caused sepsis which led to her death rather than the head injuries, adding that the medicine administered to Nikki by doctors is no longer prescribed to children, as it may cause serious complications. Furthermore, the bruising and internal bleeding cited by the prosecution could have been caused during life saving efforts, via reorientation of the skull to adjust for urgent intubation, in an effort to prevent brain death. For their part, prosecutors maintained that Roberson's new evidence did not disprove that Nikki had died from head injuries inflicted by her father.

Roberson was reportedly diagnosed afterward with autism, a neurodevelopmental disorder that can lead to difficulties in social communication. According to a former detective, the later revelation of Roberson's then-undiagnosed condition made him realize that the strange behavior displayed by Roberson in response to his daughter's death, behavior which prompted investigators' suspicions of Roberson, was likely due to autism, and not necessarily an indication of guilt.

Originally, Roberson was slated to be executed on June 21, 2016, after he had exhausted all his appeals against the death sentence. However, four days before the execution date, Roberson was granted a stay of execution, and a court hearing was convened to review his case. The main point of the hearing was to determine whether Roberson's conviction should stand in light of the discredited theory of shaken baby syndrome. Some murder convictions based upon shaken baby syndrome had been overturned by the courts under a new Texas law which in part targets cases of convictions based upon junk science. The evidentiary hearing came to an end on March 19, 2021.

On January 11, 2023, the Texas Court of Criminal Appeals decided that there was insufficient basis for the court to intervene in Roberson's case after they found that the doubt surrounding the death of Nikki and purported concerns with the theory of shaken baby syndrome was not enough to bring Roberson off death row nor revoke his conviction for murder. Similarly, the U.S. Supreme Court rejected another appeal from Roberson on October 2, 2023.

== 2024 execution stay ==
On July 1, 2024, the trial court in Anderson County approved a death warrant for Roberson, and his execution was scheduled for October 17, 2024. Roberson was reportedly the first death row prisoner convicted on the grounds of "shaken baby syndrome" to have an execution date scheduled in the United States. When the scheduling of Roberson's execution was publicized, his case was heavily debated over whether his murder conviction and death sentence should stand in light of criticisms of "shaken baby syndrome", and the lingering concerns of Roberson's alleged innocence were heightened after the announcement of his execution date. In a final series of legal attempts to escape the death penalty, Roberson and his lawyers appealed to the state courts to overturn his conviction and sentence, stating that he was innocent and never killed Nikki. Roberson also brought up his undiagnosed autism to seek mercy and argued that it had hindered him from having a fair trial. An appeal to the Texas Court of Criminal Appeals was rejected on September 11, 2024.

There was considerable support coming from lawmakers and law enforcement personnel to stave off Roberson's execution. Reverend Brian Wharton, a former police officer who investigated Roberson's case and whose testimony helped send Roberson to death row, advocated for the commutation of Roberson's death sentence, stating he believed at this stage that the conviction or sentence should not have happened if proper investigations had been made in the case, especially since Roberson's autism went undiagnosed.

A clemency petition signed by 84 lawmakers from the 150-member state House, bestselling novelist John Grisham, medical experts, death penalty attorneys and former detectives of the case was submitted to the state Pardons Board for the commutation of Roberson's death sentence to life without parole. One of these supporters, John Grisham, cited his reason behind his support for clemency, stating that no crime had taken place to begin with and that Texas was about to execute an innocent man. Under Texas state law, the final recourse for inmates awaiting their scheduled execution was to appeal for clemency and the Texas Board of Pardons and Paroles would decide whether to recommend clemency, with the governor having the final say, although it was noted that the governor Greg Abbott had rarely granted clemency throughout his tenure. Two weeks before he was to be executed, Roberson also made a personal plea to the governor to spare his life.

On October 8, 2024, Roberson was granted a new hearing of his appeal against the death sentence but on October 11, 2024, Roberson's appeal was dismissed by the Texas Court of Criminal Appeals. On October 15, 2024, Administrative Judge Alfonso Charles, who was the Tenth Administrative Judicial Region presiding judge, rejected the appeal of Roberson to vacate his death warrant. On that same date, the Texas House of Representative's Committee on Criminal Jurisprudence approved a subpoena to allow Roberson to testify before a Texas House committee in relation to his case. On October 16, 2024, the Texas parole board voted unanimously, 6–0, against recommending Roberson's sentence be commuted or his execution delayed. Abbott can only grant a pardon at the parole board's recommendation. The only remaining path to prevent Roberson's execution would be if Abbott awarded a 30-day reprieve to allow litigation to continue, and Abbott expressed no intention to do so. Roberson's counsel urged the governor to grant him a reprieve to allow them more time to prepare their case for continuing to fight for Roberson's life.

Simultaneously, as a last resort to evade the death penalty, Roberson appealed to the U.S. Supreme Court. The Texas Attorney General's office had responded that Roberson had failed to prove his innocence and it had been upheld by multiple court proceedings that the cause of Nikki Curtis's death was "inconsistent with a short fall from a bed or complications from a virus". The U.S. Supreme Court rejected this final appeal hours before the scheduled timing of Roberson's execution. Roberson was slated to be put to death via lethal injection at 6:00 pm CDT on October 17 in the Huntsville Unit. However, a Travis County judge issued an order to temporarily block the execution. The Texas Court of Criminal Appeals subsequently overturned the stay after the prosecution appealed and ordered the execution to move forward. However, the Supreme Court of Texas intervened and temporarily halted the execution after Roberson's attorney and state lawmakers filed a last-second appeal for a stay.

Roberson was scheduled to testify before the House committee on October 21, 2024, where the lawmakers were to consider his testimony when determining whether amendments should be made to Texas law governing "junk science". However, Texas Attorney General Ken Paxton barred Roberson from appearing in person to testify, saying it wouldn't be safe to bring a death row inmate to the Capitol. On November 15, 2024, the Texas Supreme Court ruled that state lawmakers had "exceeded their power" when they called on Roberson to testify before a House committee. A new execution date can be set, but the court also said lawmakers could still call Roberson to testify and that the executive branch would have to accommodate such a request. On December 2, 2024, the judge who signed Roberson's death warrant, Judge Deborah Oakes Evans, voluntarily recused herself from the case.

== 2025 execution stay ==
On June 17, 2025, Texas Attorney General Ken Paxton lodged a second motion to seek a new execution date for Roberson, after the prosecution of the case was transferred to his office at the request of District Attorney Allyson Mitchell. On July 16, state district Judge Austin Reeve Jackson scheduled the execution for October 16, 2025. On September 26, 2025, it was reported that Roberson waived his right to petition for clemency. Instead, he would channel his last attention and efforts into seeking a new trial for his murder conviction. On October 9, 2025, the Court of Criminal Appeals issued an emergency stay of execution. The court's stay sends the matter back to the trial court to review the science based on the state's 2013 junk science law.

== Media attention and public opinion ==
The appellate process and statements made by politicians have generated extensive media coverage. Novelist John Grisham is writing about the case in a non-fiction book to be titled, SHAKEN: The Rush to Execute an Innocent Man, set to publish in spring 2027.

Many people have begun to argue that the definition of shaken baby syndrome has changed since the time of Roberson's conviction, including his attorney, Gretchen Sween. Doctors have come forward to argue that Nikki's cause of death was actually undiagnosed pneumonia and medications which suppressed her respiratory system, causing public outcry.

== See also ==
- Capital punishment in Texas
- List of death row inmates in the United States § Texas
