= The Listserve =

Email lottery

- Type: Email list
- Launch date: April 2012
- Website: thelistserve.com

The Listserve was a global email lottery, where one subscriber was randomly selected each day to send an email to all other subscribers. The project started in April 2012 and was designed as a social experiment, aiming to give ordinary people a platform to share their thoughts with a large audience, while only allowing readers to reply directly to the writer.

== History ==
The Listserve was created by Alvin Chang, Greg Dorsainville, Yoonjo Choi, Zena Koo, and Josh Begley. They conceived of the idea as graduate students at New York University's Interactive Telecommunications Program (ITP). The idea behind The Listserve was to explore what people would say if they had the opportunity to address a large audience with a single email. Each day, a random subscriber was chosen to send an email to all other subscribers.

The project quickly gained attention and grew in popularity, amassing tens of thousands of subscribers from around the world. The emails covered a wide range of topics, from personal stories and advice to political opinions and philosophical musings.

The Listserve ceased operations in 2018.

== Format ==
Subscribers to The Listserve received one email per day, written by a randomly selected member of the list. The emails were unedited. There were no specific rules about what could be shared, but contributors were encouraged to be thoughtful and respectful.

== Reception ==
The Listserve received significant media attention shortly after its launch. It was praised for its simplicity and the unique way it facilitated personal communication, counter to the popular social media platforms of the era. Publications such as The New York Times, Time, The Wall Street Journal, and The Observer covered The Listserve, highlighting the diverse range of content that subscribers shared. One Listserve winner used her email to invite the email list to a picnic in Prospect Park, Brooklyn, which led to a gathering of several dozen people on August 26, 2012.

Critics, however, pointed out that the platform's unmoderated nature could lead to the spread of misinformation or offensive content. Despite these concerns, the platform maintained a positive reputation throughout its operation.
