= Waney Squier =

British neuropathologist

Waney (Marian Valerie) Squier
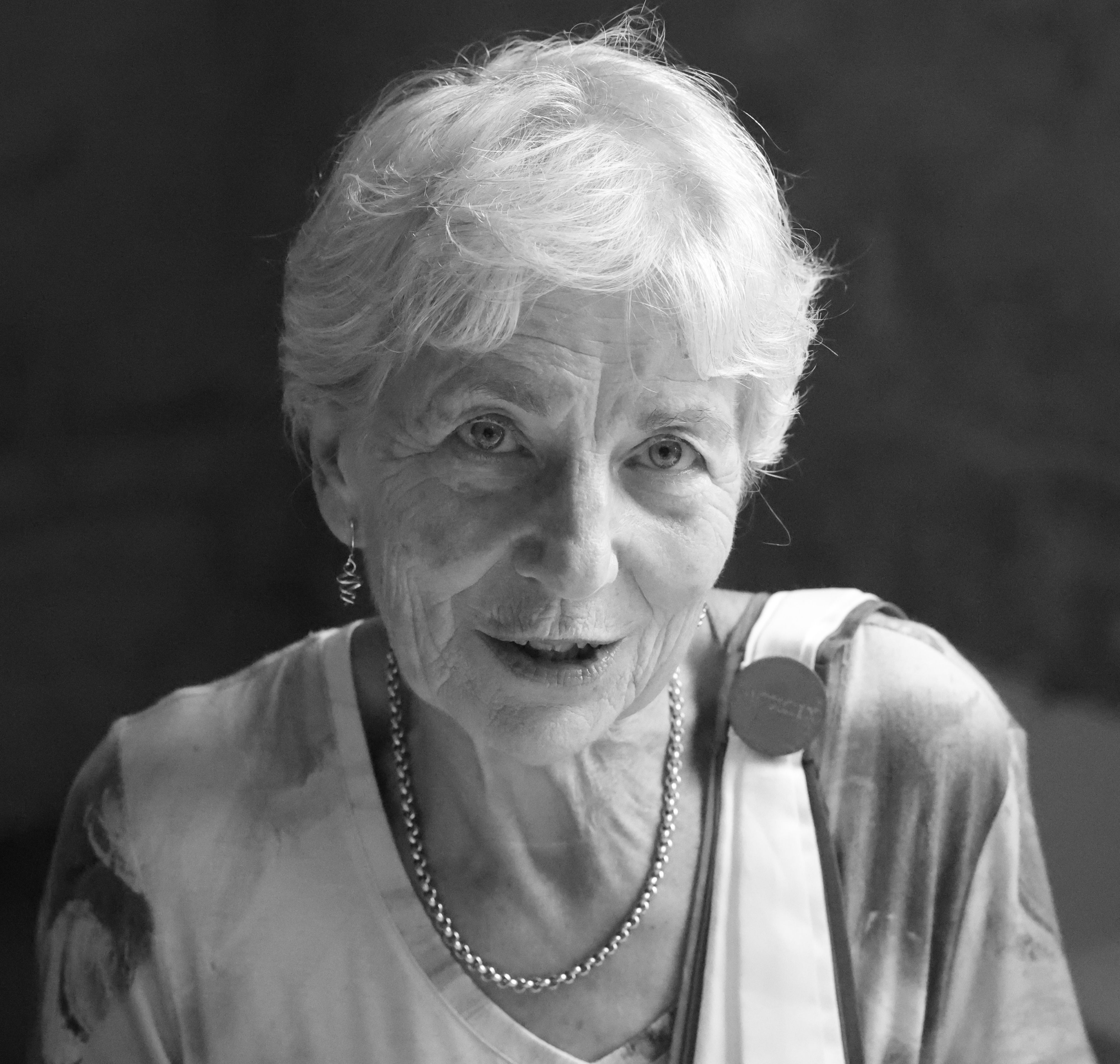
- Dr. Waney Squier in 2023
- Born: February 28, 1948 (age 78)
- Citizenship: British
- Education: University of Oxford
- Known for: Neuropathology research, Shaken Baby Syndrome research
- Scientific career
- Workplaces: John Radcliffe Hospital

Notes
- [https://scholar.google.com/citations?hl=en&user=lCzTh7kAAAAJ

Waney Squier is a neuropathologist specialising in the brain of the developing foetus and neonate. She has written a book on acquired damage to the developing brain and is senior author on peer-reviewed publications ranging in topic from fetal to childhood infection, polymicrogyria, hydrocephalus, brain ischemia, head trauma and mimics of trauma caused by vascular pathology. She is an expert on dura mater and dural bleeding.

Many of her publications question Shaken Baby Syndrome, preferentially termed Abusive Head Trauma since 2009.

She worked at the John Radcliffe Hospital in Oxford, UK, but also served as an expert witness, particularly in cases where babies had died as a result of suspected abusive head trauma or shaken baby syndrome. In April 2010, a complaint about her was made to the General Medical Council by the National Policing Improvement Agency, since then disbanded.

Following various disciplinary and legal processes, she appeared before the Medical Practitioners Tribunal Service between October 2015 and March 2016. The charges against her related to six babies about whom she had provided reports and given evidence. It was alleged that she expressed opinions outside her field of expertise, made assertions that were not supported by evidence, and misrepresented research papers to support her opinions. At the conclusion of the hearing, the tribunal determined that Squier was guilty of repeated dishonesty, her fitness to practice was impaired, and that she should be struck off the medical register.

Squier appealed the tribunal's decision to the High Court of England and Wales during October 2016. On 3 November 2016, the court published a judgment which concluded that "the determination of the MPT is in many significant respects flawed". The judge found that she had committed serious professional misconduct but was not dishonest. She was reinstated to the medical register but is not allowed to give expert evidence in court for three years.

Squier retired in 2017. At one time, she believed in the theory of shaken baby syndrome and appeared as a witness for the prosecution in a number of cases. However, on examining the available evidence for the theory more closely, she has come to believe that there is no evidence for shaken baby syndrome and that it does not exist. She described her intellectual journey in a 2018 TEDx talk.
