= Norman Guthkelch =

British neurosurgeon (1915–2016)

- Born: September 2, 1915; Woodford Green, East London, England, UK
- Died: July 28, 2016 (aged 100); Toledo, Ohio, U.S.
- Occupation: Pediatric neurosurgeon
- Known for: Describing shaken baby syndrome

Arthur Norman Guthkelch (September 2, 1915 – July 28, 2016) was a British pediatric neurosurgeon. He is sometimes known as the first British pediatric neurosurgeon. He was the first physician to make a connection between shaking an infant and subsequent brain injury.

== Biography ==
Guthkelch was born in Woodford Green. He had wanted to become a veterinarian in early childhood, but he shifted his goal to becoming a physician by the second grade. He attended Christ's Hospital school, Horsham. He read medicine at the University of Oxford. He was a registrar at the Manchester Royal Infirmary. Guthkelch worked at the Manchester Royal Infirmary, Salford Royal Hospital, Royal Manchester Children's Hospital and Hull Royal Infirmary. His early career was influenced by the neurosurgeon Sir Geoffrey Jefferson. Guthkelch has been described as the first pediatric neurosurgeon in Great Britain.

Making the connection between subdural hematoma and babies who had sustained shaking injuries, Guthkelch published his conclusions in a 1971 British Medical Journal paper. He said that since there was no stigma associated with shaking infants in Northern England at that time, parents were frank with him that these injured infants had been shaken.

Guthkelch retired from full-time clinical practice 1992 at University Health Sciences Center, Tucson, Arizona, Department of Neurosurgery.

In 2009 he began reviewing cases in which people were charged with injuring children by shaking. He was critical of the broad application of the shaken baby syndrome diagnosis in legal proceedings, saying that medical illnesses could sometimes cause similar issues to shaken baby syndrome. He published a clarion call for civility in the discourse concerning the controversy, and that it was not possible to infer shaking or any other form of abuse from retino-dural hemorrhage. "In a case of measles, if you get the diagnosis wrong, in seven days' time it really doesn't matter because it's cleared up anyhow," Guthkelch said. "If you get the diagnosis of fatal shaken baby syndrome wrong, potentially someone's life will be terminated." In September 2015, he told Retro Report that he was "shocked" and "desperately disappointed" that prosecutors were using his science as a basis to convict people.

The Society for Research into Hydrocephalus and Spina Bifida bestows the Norman Guthkelch Award upon a student or early career scientist involved in spina bifida or hydrocephalus research.

Guthkelch lived in Ohio. He turned 100 in September 2015. On July 28, 2016 Guthkelch died at the age of 100 in Toledo, Ohio.

== See also ==
- List of centenarians (medical professionals)
