= I Am Rich =

Notably expensive iOS application

- I Am Rich, as it appeared in the United States' version of the App Store
- Developer: Armin Heinrich
- Release: 5 August 2008; 18 years ago
- Operating system: iPhone OS
- Available in: English

I Am Rich is a discontinued 2008 mobile app for iPhones which had minimal function and was priced at US$999.99 (equivalent to $1,495 in 2025). The app was pulled from the App Store less than 24 hours after its launch. Receiving negative reviews from critics, only eight copies were sold. In the years since, several similar applications have been released at lower prices.

== Overview ==
I Am Rich was developed as a joke by German software developer, Armin Heinrich, after he saw iPhone users complaining about software priced above $0.99. The app only showed a glowing red gem and an icon that, when pressed, displayed the following mantra in large text:

I am rich

I deserv [sic] it

I am good,

healthy & successful

Heinrich told The New York Times that "I regard it as art. I did not expect many people to buy it and did not expect all the fuss about it."

The application is described as "a work of art with no hidden function at all", with its only purpose being to show other people that they were able to afford it. Vox writer Zachary Crockett called it "the ultimate Veblen good in app form".

== Release ==
Heinrich released and distributed I Am Rich through the App Store on 5 August 2008. The app was sold for US$999.99 (equivalent to $1,495 in 2025), €799.99 (equivalent to €1,078 in 2023), and £599.99 (equivalent to £978.12 in 2025), the highest prices Apple allowed for App Store content. Without explanation, Apple removed the application from the App Store less than a day after its release.

=== Purchases ===
I saw this app with a few friends and we jokingly clicked 'buy' thinking it was a joke, to see what would happen. ... THIS IS NO JOKE...DO NOT BUY THIS APP AND APPLE PLEASE REMOVE THIS FROM THE APP STORE

This is not a joke! I need someone from apple to help me with this scam. I saw this app with a few friends and we jokingly clicked ‘buy’ thinking it was a JOKE, to see what would happen….I called my visa card and they verified I was charged $999.99. THIS IS NO JOKE. DO NOT BUY THIS APP. BEWARE...

— Customer complaints for I Am Rich

Eight people bought the application, at least one of whom claimed to have done so accidentally. Six US sales and two European sales netted $5,600 for Heinrich and $2,400 for Apple (respectively equivalent to $8,374 and $3,589 in 2025). In correspondence with the Los Angeles Times, Heinrich told the newspaper that Apple had refunded two purchasers of his app, and that he was happy to not have dissatisfied customers.

== Reception ==
Discussing the app on the website Silicon Alley Insider, Dan Frommer described the program as a "scam", "worthless", and finally "a joke that smells like a scammy rip-off" on August 5, 6, and 8, respectively. Without purchasing the app, Fox News's Paul Wagenseil guessed that the secret mantra was "German for 'Sucker!'" (Heinrich is German). Wired's Brian X. Chen described I Am Rich as a waste of money to "prove you're a jerk", and contrasted the expenditure with donating to cancer foundations and Third World countries.

Heinrich told the Los Angeles Times's Mark Milian that he had received correspondence from satisfied customers: "I've got e-mails from customers telling me that they really love the app [... and that they had] no trouble spending the money". In an interview with The New York Times, though, he told of receiving many insulting emails and telephone messages.

== Similar applications ==
The next year, Heinrich released I Am Rich LE. Priced at US$9.99 (equivalent to $14.99 in 2025), the new app has several new features (including a calculator, "help system", and the "famous mantra without the spelling mistakes") to meet Apple's requirement that apps have "definable content". Some customers were disappointed by the new functionality, poorly rating the app due to its ostensible improvements.

On 23 February 2009, CNET Asia reported on the "conceptually similar" app, I Am Richer, developed by Mike DG for Google's Android. The app was released on the Android Market for US$200 (equivalent to $300.14 in 2025), a limit imposed by Google, who had no objection to the application.

With the same name, the I Am Rich that was released on the Windows Phone Marketplace on 22 December 2010, was developed by DotNetNuzzi. Described by MobileCrunch as equally useless as the original, this app cost US$499.99 (equivalent to $738.2 in 2025), the price cap imposed by Microsoft.

== See also ==
- Baby Shaker – 2009 video game
- Send Me to Heaven – Android application known for encouraging risky behavior
