= Send Me to Heaven =

Android application known for encouraging risky behavior

Send Me To Heaven
- App icon as it appears on Google Play
- Developer: Carrot Pop
- Initial release: May 10, 2013; 13 years ago
- Stable release: 1.8.99 / December 8, 2025; 6 months ago
- Operating system: Android
- Size: 15 MB
- Available in: English

Send Me To Heaven (officially stylized as S.M.T.H.) is an Android application developed by Carrot Pop which measures the vertical distance that a mobile phone is thrown. Players compete against each other by seeking to throw their phones higher than others, often at the risk of damaging their phones. The app was immediately banned from the Apple App Store but remains available on Google Play.

== Gameplay ==
A video of a woman playing Send Me To Heaven

The mobile game opens with a warning that requests players to be aware of their surroundings, along with a legal disclaimer absolving the developer from any injuries or damages that may result from playing.

Players are instructed to throw their phones as high as they can, with minimal rotation for most accurate results. The maximum height is calculated via the phone's accelerometer. Because some phones have accelerometers positioned off-center, any rotation in those phones may confound the data. "Cheating" by throwing a phone from a tall building typically returns an error message. The app's calculations keep track of how long the phone takes to rise and fall, and an error message is displayed if the distance fallen exceeds the length of the ascent.

Exceptionally good scores may appear on the game's leader board, which is divided into the categories World Top 10, Week Top 10, Day Top 10 and Local Top 10. Some users reported scores as high as 40 meters (131 feet), which Svarovsky discovered was the result of players firing their phones into the air with slingshots.

== Development ==
Petr Svarovsky, a Czech-born Norwegian artist who founded Carrot Pop to develop transgressive smartphone apps, indicated during an interview with WIRED magazine that he hoped to have people destroy as many iPhones as possible while playing his game. "The original idea was to have very expensive gadgets, which people in certain societies buy just to show off, and to get them to throw it."

== Reception ==
"No Point On Playing This UNLESS Your [sic] Rich And Can Buy A Few More Phones."

"Already got a good ding on the corner of my RAZR from it. BAHAHAHAHA!"

— Reviews for Send Me To Heaven

According to Svarovsky, the first demo of the game took place at a music festival in Oslo, Norway. Attendees were so enthusiastic with the idea that many began throwing their phones into the air without bothering to download the app.

Apple rejected Send Me To Heaven from their App Store, citing policies against encouraging the damage of an iOS device.

Users have left generally positive reviews for the app. An official Facebook page allows players to share photos and videos of their attempts. The game attracted notoriety upon its release in 2013 and has experienced brief renewals of popularity since, most recently in 2017.

Due to the rejection of Send Me To Heaven from the Apple App Store, the only iOS device currently running a copy of Send Me To Heaven is Petr Svarovsky's personal iPhone, which contains the app prototype. Svarovsky has attempted to sell the badly damaged iPhone multiple times as a "collectible" game item. The phone was offered for US$30,000 (equivalent to $37,778 in 2025) on Etsy and, later, for $100,000 (equivalent to $125,927 in 2025) on Saatchi Art.

== See also ==
- Baby Shaker – 2009 video game
- I Am Rich – Notably expensive iOS application
