= Shaken baby syndrome =

Disputed medical condition

- Other names: Abusive head trauma, non-accidental head injury, non-accidental trauma, shaken impact syndrome, inflicted head injury, whiplash shake syndrome
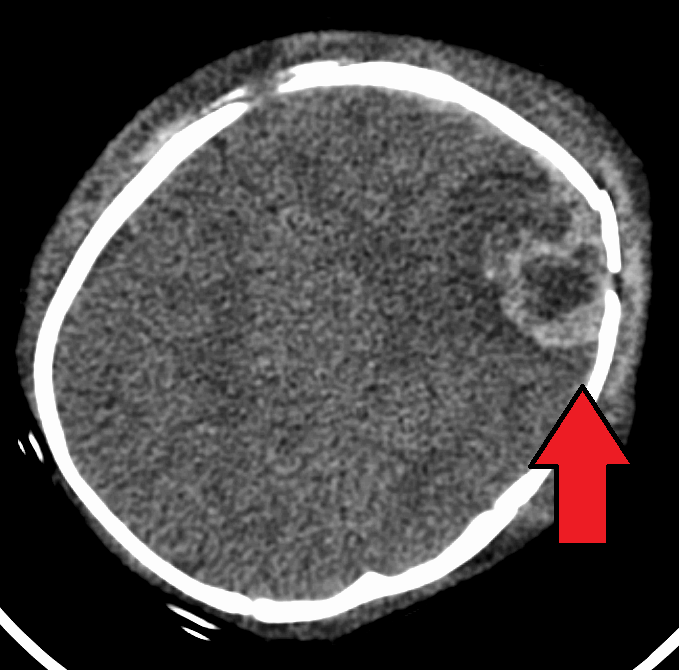
- An intraparenchymal bleed with overlying skull fracture
- Specialty: Pediatrics
- Symptoms: Variable
- Complications: Seizures, visual impairment, cerebral palsy, cognitive impairment
- Usual onset: Less than 5 years old
- Causes: Disputed, proponents argue blunt trauma and vigorous shaking
- Frequency: 3 per 10,000 babies per year (US)
- Deaths: ≈18-25% of hospitalised cases

Shaken baby syndrome (SBS), also known as abusive head trauma (AHT), is a controversial medical condition in children younger than five years old, hypothesized to be caused by blunt trauma, vigorous shaking, or a combination of both.

According to medical literature, the condition is caused by violent shaking with or without blunt impact that can lead to long-term health consequences for infants or children. Diagnosis can be difficult, but is generally characterized by the triad of findings: retinal hemorrhage, encephalopathy, and subdural hematoma. A CT scan of the head is typically recommended if a concern is present. If there are concerning findings on the CT scan, a full work-up for child abuse often occurs, including an eye exam and skeletal survey. Retinal hemorrhage is highly associated with AHT, occurring in 78–85% of cases of AHT versus 5% of cases of non-abusive head trauma, although such findings rely on contested methodology. A 2023 review concluded "research has shown the triad is not sufficient to infer shaking or abuse and the shaking hypothesis does not meet the standards of evidence-based medicine", and argued the symptoms may arise from naturally occurring retinal haemorrhage.

The concept is controversial in child abuse pediatrics, with critics arguing it is an unproven hypothesis that has little diagnostic accuracy. Diagnosis has proven to be both challenging and contentious for medical professionals because objective witnesses to the initial trauma are generally unavailable, and when independent witnesses to shaking are available, the injuries comprising the traditional SBS triad occur at lower rates. This is said to be particularly problematic when the trauma is deemed "non-accidental". Some medical professionals propose that SBS is the result of respiratory abnormalities leading to hypoxia and swelling of the brain. Symptoms of SBS may also be non-specific markers of the degree of intracranial pathology. The courtroom has become a forum for conflicting theories with which generally accepted medical literature has not been reconciled. There are often no outwardly visible signs of trauma, despite the presence of severe internal brain and eye injury.

According to proponents, SBS is the leading cause of fatal head injuries in children under two, with a risk of death of about 18-25% of hospitalised cases. This figure has been criticized for circular reasoning and selection bias. Systematic case reviews have documented that shaking alone can cause subdural hemorrhages, retinal hemorrhages, and acute neurological symptoms consistent with abusive head trauma, though studies suggest that impacts generally produce more severe intracranial pathologies than shaking. The most common symptoms are said to be retinal bleeds, multiple fractures of the long bones, and subdural hematomas (bleeding in the brain). Educating new parents appears to be beneficial in decreasing rates of the condition, although other studies have shown that education does not change rates. SBS is estimated to occur in three to four per 10,000 babies per year.

Some experts state that retinal hemorrhage (bleeding) being a common symptom is based on circular reasoning and selection bias. RHs are very rare when infants are actually witnessed to have been shaken. The type of retinal bleeds are often believed to be particularly characteristic of this condition, making the finding useful in establishing the diagnosis, although the former studies may suggest the contrary.

Infants may display irritability, failure to thrive, alterations in eating patterns, lethargy, vomiting, seizures, bulging or tense fontanelles (the soft spots on a baby's head), increased size of the head, altered breathing, and dilated pupils, although all these clinical findings are generic and are known to have a range of causes, with shaking certainly not the most common cause of any of them. Complications include seizures, visual impairment, hearing loss, epilepsy, cerebral palsy, cognitive impairment, cardiac arrest, coma, and death.

== Signs and symptoms ==
Possible signs and symptoms of Shaken Baby Syndrome include lethargy, decreased muscle tone, and extreme irritability. Affected infants may show a decrease in appetite, poor feeding, or vomiting without an apparent reason. Physical signs can include grab-type bruise on the arms or chest, and lack of smiling or vocalization. Other symptoms includes poor sucking or swallowing, rigidity or posturing, and difficulty breathing. There may be a decreased level of consciousness. The soft spot on the head may appear bulging, and the infant might struggle to lift their head. In addition, the infant's eyes might not focus or track movement properly, and the pupils may be of unequal size.

=== Complications ===
The consequences of SBS can be severe and long-lasting. They include learning disabilities, physical disabilities, visual impairment or blindness, and hearing impairments. Affected individuals may also experience speech disabilities, cerebral palsy, seizures, and behavior disorders. Cognitive impairments are common, and in the most severe cases, it can result in death.

== Risk factors ==
Common risk factors for shaken baby syndrome include perceived excessive crying, behavioral health problems, domestic violence history, frustration intolerance, lack of childcare experience, young infant age, young maternal age, multiple births, having a male infant, full-time working, postpartum depression, single parent families and economic adversity. The perpetrators of acute head trauma typically involve the father, stepfather, mother's boyfriend, female babysitter and the mother. The age group from child birth to the age of 4 are at greater risk of SBS due to multiple factors, including disproportionate anatomy, lack of or inability to communicate needs, and inability to protect self from a larger adult.

Episodes of colic are greatest at 6 to 8 weeks of age, and studies have shown a peak in SBS incidence during this time as parents may perceive these episodes as excessive crying. Caregivers that are at risk for becoming abusive often have unrealistic expectations of the child and may display "role reversal", expecting the child to fulfill the needs of the caregiver. Substance abuse and emotional stress, resulting for example from low socioeconomic status or family instability, are other risk factors for aggression and impulsiveness in caregivers. Caregivers of any gender can cause SBS, but cases of SBS have been reported to be more common amongst younger parents. Studies have shown increased prevalence of SBS among parents 34 years old or younger, especially 24 years old or younger. Although it had been previously speculated that SBS was an isolated event, evidence of prior child abuse is a common finding. In an estimated 33–40% of cases, evidence of prior head injuries, such as old intracranial bleeds, is present.

At the community level, risk factors for shaken baby syndrome include social isolation, lack of recreational facilities, lack of external support from family or governmental agencies, unsafe neighborhoods and societal factors such as poverty.

== Mechanism ==
Shaken Baby Syndrome, also known as Shaken Impact Syndrome, is a severe form of child abuse. It occurs when parents or caregivers shake a baby. There is a strong association between crying and SBS, where studies indicate 1–6% of parents have shaken their babies to stop crying. Furthermore, the caregiver's worries and views on crying are more predictive of shaking than the objective amount of crying. Evidence indicates early crying pattern as the common trigger for SBS, and it results from a failure in what is usually a normal interaction between infants and caregivers.

Effects of SBS are thought to be diffuse axonal injury, oxygen deprivation and swelling of the brain, which can raise pressure inside the skull and damage delicate brain tissue, although witnessed shaking events have not led to such injuries. Direct injuries include skull fractures, cortical contusions, diffuse axonal injuries, and hemorrhages. Indirect injuries includes brain edema and herniation.

Traumatic shaking occurs when a child is shaken in such a way that its head is flung backwards and forwards. This swift movement resulted in collision of brain to the skull, potentially tearing blood vessels and leading to bleeding around the brain, resulting in the formation of hematoma. As the hematoma enlarges, it can increase pressure within the skull, causing further injury to the brain. Then, in 1971, Guthkelch, a neurosurgeon, hypothesized that such shaking can result in a subdural hematoma, in the absence of any detectable external signs of injury to the skull. The article describes two cases in which the parents admitted that for various reasons they had shaken the child before it became ill. Moreover, one of the babies had retinal hemorrhages. The association between traumatic shaking, subdural hematoma and retinal hemorrhages was described in 1972 and referred to as whiplash shaken infant syndrome. The injuries were believed to occur because shaking the child subjected the head to acceleration–deceleration and rotational forces. However, in the 50 years since that time, no scientifically reliable evidence has been found to support this hypothesis.

=== Injuries ===
The mechanical basis for SBS comes from a combination of babies having weaker neck muscles and larger heads. For example, shaking the baby can lead to veins and nerves stretching and shearing due to the head extending beyond what the baby's neck can support. Other types of injuries that can occur when shaking a baby, with or without the sudden deceleration of the head, are the following:

- Subdural hematoma, a collection of blood between the brain's surface and the dura, due to overstretching of the veins connecting the brain to the dura, leading to tears and bleeding.
- Subarachnoid hemorrhage, bleeding between the brain and arachnoid
- Direct brain trauma, due to the brain striking the inner surfaces of the skull.
- Eye injury, retinal hemorrhage caused by to and from oscillation of the lens
- Skeletal injury, posterior rib fracture caused by squeezing the chest as the child is tightly gripped.

=== Force ===
There has been controversy regarding the amount of force required to produce the brain damage seen in SBS. There is broad agreement, even amongst skeptics, that shaking of a baby is dangerous and can be fatal.

A biomechanical analysis by F. A. Bandak published in 2005 reported that "forceful shaking can severely injure or kill an infant, this is because the cervical spine would be severely injured and not because subdural hematomas would be caused by high head rotational accelerations ... an infant head subjected to the levels of rotational velocity and acceleration called for in the SBS literature, would experience forces on the infant neck far exceeding the limits for structural failure of the cervical spine. Furthermore, shaking cervical spine injury can occur at much lower levels of head velocity and acceleration than those reported for SBS." Other authors were critical of the mathematical analysis by Bandak, citing concerns about the calculations the author used concluding "In light of the numerical errors in Bandak's neck force estimations, we question the resolute tenor of Bandak's conclusions that neck injuries would occur in all shaking events." Other authors critical of the model proposed by Bandak concluding "the mechanical analogue proposed in the paper may not be entirely appropriate when used to model the motion of the head and neck of infants when a baby is shaken." Bandak responded to the criticism in a letter to the editor published in Forensic Science International in February 2006.

== Diagnosis ==
Diagnosis can be difficult as symptoms may be nonspecific. Symptoms may include altered mental status, trouble breathing, and vomiting. As a result, about 31% of true SBS cases may go unnoticed initially. However, imaging can provide valuable information about a potential SBS diagnosis. Imaging must be performed within at least 24 hours of the suspected injury to detect brain edema characteristic of SBS. A CT scan of the head is typically recommended if a concern is present. If there are concerning findings, a brain MRI is also recommended, which can further reveal parenchymal injuries and hemorrhages. It is unclear how useful subdural haematoma, retinal hemorrhages, and encephalopathy are alone at making the diagnosis.

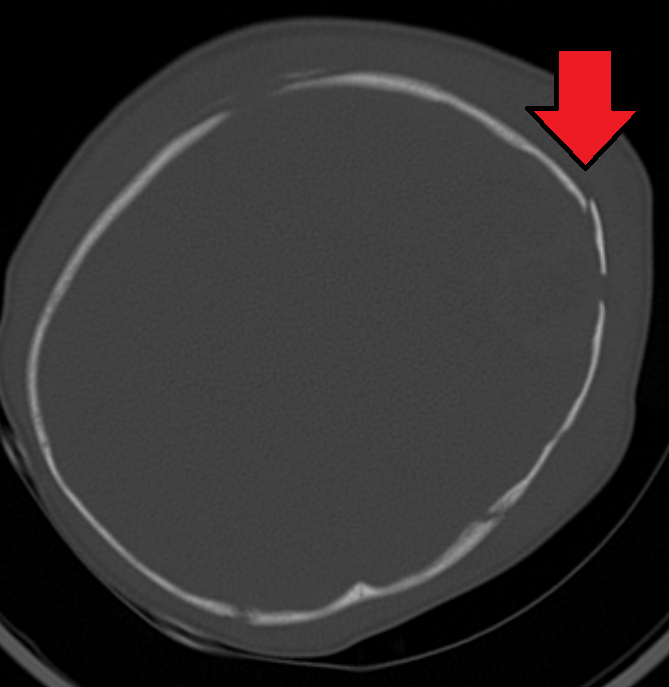
A skull fracture from abusive head trauma in an infant

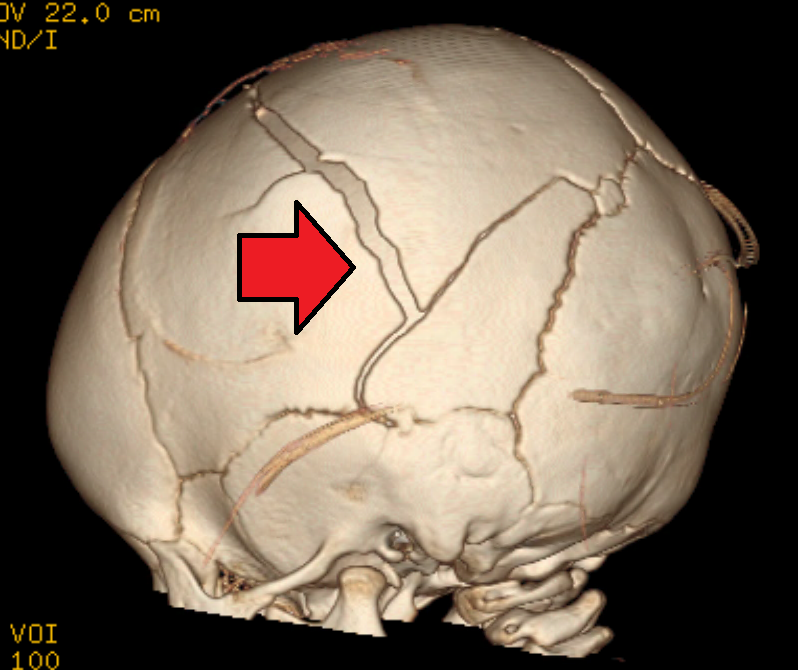
3D CT reconstruction showing a skull fracture in an infant

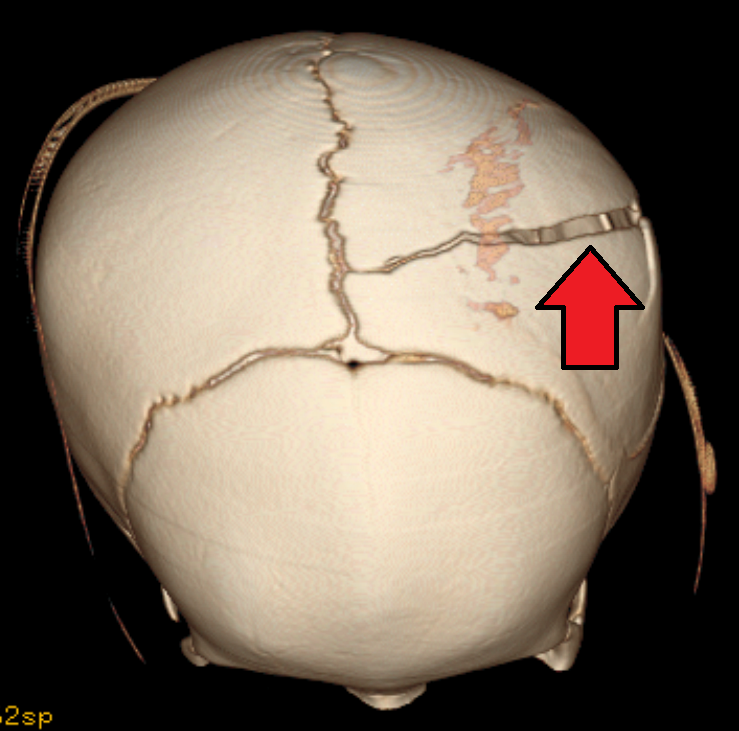
3D CT reconstruction showing a skull fracture in an infant

=== Triad ===
While the findings of SBS are complex and many, they are often incorrectly referred to as a "triad" for legal proceedings; distilled down to retinal hemorrhages, subdural hematomas, and encephalopathy. A 2023 review concluded "research has shown the triad is not sufficient to infer shaking or abuse and the shaking hypothesis does not meet the standards of evidence based medicine".

SBS may be misdiagnosed, underdiagnosed, and overdiagnosed, and caregivers may lie or be unaware of the mechanism of injury. Commonly, there are no externally visible signs of the condition. Examination by an experienced ophthalmologist is critical in diagnosing shaken baby syndrome, as particular forms of ocular bleeding are strongly associated with AHT. Magnetic resonance imaging may also depict retinal hemorrhaging but is much less sensitive than an eye exam. Conditions that are often excluded by clinicians include hydrocephalus, sudden infant death syndrome (SIDS), seizure disorders, and infectious or congenital diseases like meningitis and metabolic disorders. CT scanning and magnetic resonance imaging are used to diagnose the condition. Conditions that often accompany SBS/AHT include classic patterns of skeletal fracturing (rib fractures, corner fractures), injury to the cervical spine (in the neck), retinal hemorrhage, cerebral bleed or atrophy, hydrocephalus, and papilledema (swelling of the optic disc).

The terms non-accidental head injury or inflicted traumatic brain injury have been used in place of "abusive head trauma" or "SBS".

=== Classification ===
The US Centers for Disease Control and Prevention identifies SBS as "an injury to the skull or intracranial contents of an infant or young child (< 5 years of age) due to inflicted blunt impact and/or violent shaking". In 2009, the American Academy of Pediatrics recommended the use of the term abusive head trauma (AHT) to replace SBS, in part to differentiate injuries arising solely from shaking and injuries arising from shaking as well as trauma to the head. AHT is a more internationally-recognized term, as it encompasses various mechanisms of injury, such as impact alone or impact due to shaking.

The Crown Prosecution Service for England and Wales recommended in 2011 that the term shaken baby syndrome be avoided and the term non accidental head injury (NAHI) be used instead.

=== Differential diagnosis ===
==== Vitamin C deficiency ====
Some authors have suggested that certain cases of suspected shaken baby syndrome may result from vitamin C deficiency. This contested hypothesis is based upon a speculated marginal, near scorbutic condition or lack of essential nutrient(s) repletion and a potential elevated histamine level. However, symptoms consistent with increased histamine levels, such as low blood pressure and allergic symptoms, are not commonly associated with scurvy as clinically significant vitamin C deficiency. A literature review of this hypothesis in the journal Pediatrics International concluded the following: "From the available information in the literature, concluded that there was no convincing evidence to conclude that vitamin C deficiency can be considered to be a cause of shaken baby syndrome."

The proponents of such hypotheses often question the adequacy of nutrient tissue levels, especially vitamin C, for those children currently or recently ill, bacterial infections, those with higher individual requirements, those with environmental challenges (e.g. allergies), and perhaps transient vaccination-related stresses. At the time of this writing, infantile scurvy in the United States is practically nonexistent. No cases of scurvy mimicking SBS or sudden infant death syndrome have been reported, and scurvy typically occurs later in infancy, rarely causes death or intracranial bleeding, and is accompanied by other changes of the bones and skin and invariably an unusually deficient dietary history.

In one study vaccination was shown not associated with retinal hemorrhages.

==== Vitamin D deficiency ====
Some authors have also suggested that suspected symptoms of SBS may actually be caused by vitamin D deficiency. Infants that are vitamin D deficient during gestation or experience physical impact during delivery may present with a fracture commonly seen in SBS cases.

==== Gestational problems ====
Gestational problems affecting both mother and fetus, the birthing process, prematurity and nutritional deficits can accelerate skeletal and hemorrhagic pathologies that can also mimic SBS, even before birth.

== Prevention ==
Interventions by pediatric practitioners and prenatal providers are recommended by the American Academy of Pediatrics. Educating expecting parents about how to soothe an inconsolable child, as well as the dangers of physical impact to an infant, may reduce rates of SBS. Interventions by neonatal nurses include giving parents information about abusive head trauma, normal infant crying and reasons for crying, teaching how to calm an infant, and how to cope if the infant was inconsolable may reduce also rates of SBS. Educating babysitters, nannies, and other caretakers about SBS and encouraging them to reach out for help with an inconsolable infant may also reduce its rates.

== Treatment ==
Treatment involves monitoring intracranial pressure (the pressure within the skull). Treatment occasionally requires surgery, such as to place a cerebral shunt to drain fluid from the cerebral ventricles, and, if an intracranial hematoma is present, to drain the blood collection.

== Prognosis ==
Prognosis depends on severity and can range from total recovery to severe disability to death when the injury is severe. One-third of patients diagnosed with SBS die, one-third survives with a major neurological condition, and only one-third survives in good condition; therefore shaken baby syndrome puts children at risk of long-term disability. The most frequent neurological impairments experienced by 70% of SBS survivors are learning disabilities, seizure disorders, speech disabilities, hydrocephalus, cerebral palsy, and visual disorders. Endocrine dysfunction is not uncommon. It is recommended that survivors of SBS be referred to medical homes for continuous follow-up by pediatricians and their healthcare team.

== Epidemiology ==
The incidence of shaken baby syndrome is unknown due to difficulty in diagnosis, which may be caused by lack of centralized reporting system, absent signs of maltreatment, unclear presentation, and acute head trauma being classified under chronic neglect. Incidence is estimated to be 35 out of 100,000 infants, 65% of these infants have significant neurological disabilities, and 5–35% of infants die as a result of sustained injuries. For children under the age of one, US-based studies have found rates of 27.5 out of 100,000 infants for the years 1997 and 2000 and a rate of 32.2 out of 100,000 in the year 2003. However, these statistics are presumably underestimates of the actual incidence of SBS, because there are children whose injuries may not be perceived as serious enough to be hospitalized, and those who have been hospitalized but diagnosis was missed. On the other hand, there may be significant overdiagosis of SBS, which would make these findings an over-estimate.

Small children are at particularly high risk for abuse associated with SBS given the large difference in size between the small child and the caretaker. SBS is primarily observed in children under the age of two but may occur in those up to age five. The majority of cases typically occur before the infant's first birthday with the average victim age between three and eight months old. In the US, deaths due to SBS constitute about 10% of deaths due to child abuse.

== History ==
In 1971, Norman Guthkelch proposed that whiplash injury caused subdural bleeding in infants by tearing the veins in the subdural space. The term whiplash shaken infant syndrome was introduced by John Caffey, a pediatric radiologist, in 1973, describing a set of symptoms found with little or no external evidence of head trauma, including retinal bleeds and intracranial bleeds with subdural or subarachnoid bleeding or both. Development of computed tomography and magnetic resonance imaging techniques in the 1970s and 1980s advanced the ability to diagnose the syndrome. In 1997, shaken baby syndrome was brought into the national spotlight with the trial of Louise Woodward.

== Society and culture ==
=== Disputed validity and legal issues ===
The association of diagnosed SBS with deliberate assault is a matter of legal and medical contention, with conflicting opinions as to whether one necessarily implies the other. One of the main contentions is that many medical definitions create a biased picture of the defendants, marking them as the aggressor and implicitly providing a guilty verdict. Simply, this diagnosis blurs the line between diagnosis and verdict.

According to Gabaeff (2018), shaken baby syndrome is an "unproven hypothesis". Scientific challenges to its validity have been increasing.

A 2017 review concluded that there is insufficient scientific evidence to assess the accuracy of diagnosing traumatic shaking.

A 2023 academic review by Squier states: "There is insufficient scientific evidence to assume that an infant with the triad of subdural haemorrhage (SDH), retinal haemorrhage, and encephalopathy must have been shaken", and that "research has shown the triad is not sufficient to infer shaking or abuse and the shaking hypothesis does not meet the standards of evidence based medicine.

While it is widely accepted that physical abuse can lead to SBS, there is debate on if the reverse is true. In other words, can an SBS diagnosis prove that violent, intentional abuse occurred? This debate arises from the difficulty of diagnosing this condition as well as the possibility of non-abuse related causes, such as neglect, an unintentional accident, or even the trauma of birth.

The concern when combining these two factors is that it allows physicians to provide a definite cause for a condition which can have life-changing legal implications for the person accused of causing it. This is problematic since in many states, such legal sentencing is typically rendered by multidisciplinary child-abuse-prevention teams (physicians, social workers, and law enforcement).

The President's Council of Advisers on Science and Technology (PCAST) noted in its September 2016 report that there are concerns regarding the scientific validity of forensic evidence of abusive head trauma that "require urgent attention". Similarly, the Maguire model, suggested in 2011 as a potential statistical model for determining the probability that a child's trauma was caused by abuse, has been questioned. A proposed clinical prediction rule with high sensitivity and low specificity, to rule out abusive head trauma, has been published.

In July 2005, the Court of Appeal of England and Wales heard four appeals of SBS convictions: one case was dropped, the sentence was reduced for one, and two convictions were upheld. The court found that the classic triad of retinal bleeding, subdural hematoma, and acute encephalopathy are not 100% diagnostic of SBS and that clinical history is also important. In the Court's ruling, they upheld the clinical concept of SBS but dismissed one case and reduced another from murder to manslaughter. In their words: "Whilst a strong pointer to NAHI [non-accidental head injury] on its own we do not think it possible to find that it must automatically and necessarily lead to a diagnosis of NAHI. All the circumstances, including the clinical picture, must be taken into account."

The court did not believe the "unified hypothesis", proposed by British physician J. F. Geddes and colleagues, as an alternative mechanism for the subdural and retinal bleeding found in suspected cases of SBS. The unified hypothesis proposed that the bleeding was not caused by shearing of subdural and retinal veins but rather by cerebral hypoxia, increased intracranial pressure, and increased pressure in the brain's blood vessels. The court reported that "the unified hypothesis [could] no longer be regarded as a credible or alternative cause of the triad of injuries": subdural haemorrhage, retinal bleeding and encephalopathy due to hypoxemia (low blood oxygen) found in suspected SBS.

On 31 January 2008, the Wisconsin Court of Appeals granted Audrey A. Edmunds a new trial based on "competing credible medical opinions in determining whether there is a reasonable doubt as to Edmunds's guilt." Specifically, the appeals court found that "Edmunds presented evidence that was not discovered until after her conviction, in the form of expert medical testimony, that a significant and legitimate debate in the medical community has developed in the past ten years over whether infants can be fatally injured through shaking alone, whether an infant may suffer head trauma and yet experience a significant lucid interval prior to death, and whether other causes may mimic the symptoms traditionally viewed as indicating shaken baby or shaken impact syndrome."

In 2012, Norman Guthkelch, the neurosurgeon often credited with "discovering" the diagnosis of SBS, published an article "after 40 years of consideration", which is harshly critical of shaken baby prosecutions based solely on the triad of injuries. Again, in 2012, Guthkelch stated in an interview, "I think we need to go back to the drawing board and make a more thorough assessment of these fatal cases, and I am going to bet ... that we are going to find in every – or at least the large majority of cases, the child had another severe illness of some sort which was missed until too late." Furthermore, in 2015, Guthkelch went so far as to say, "I was against defining this thing as a syndrome in the first instance. To go on and say every time you see it, it's a crime ... It became an easy way to go into jail."

Teri Covington, who runs the National Center for Child Death Review Policy and Practice, worries that such caution has led to a growing number of cases of child abuse in which the abuser is not punished.

In March 2016, Waney Squier, a paediatric neuropathologist who has served as an expert witness in many shaken baby trials, was struck off the medical register. Squier denied the allegations and appealed the decision. As her case was heard by the High Court of England and Wales in October 2016, an open letter to the British Medical Journal questioning the decision to strike off Squier, was signed by 350 doctors, scientists, and attorneys. On 3 November 2016, the court published a judgment which concluded that "the determination of the MPT [Medical Practitioners Tribunal ] is in many significant respects flawed". The judge found that she had committed serious professional misconduct but was not dishonest. She was reinstated to the medical register but prohibited from giving expert evidence in court for the next three years.

In 2022, Channel 4 in the UK broadcast a documentary called The Killer Nanny: Did She Do It? concerning the Louise Woodward case. In it, civil rights lawyer Clive Stafford Smith stated, "shaken baby syndrome is bullshit".

In 2023, a New Jersey appellate court upheld a lower court's decision to bar the inclusion of SBS in two recent child abuse cases. In the decision, several reasons cited. First, there was a split in the pediatrics and biomechanics community over whether shaking alone is sufficient to cause the syndrome. This resulted in expert testimony being dismissed. Additionally, in each case, SBS was difficult to conclude and there was difficulty proving assault otherwise. However, these cases only set precedent for a narrow subsection of cases of SBS where there is no sign of impact to the babies head as well as no other means to demonstrate abuse. There has been pushback against the decision. One such critique expresses that while the court may not have found diagnosis by exclusion to be convincing enough for diagnosis and thus conviction, differential diagnosis is an acceptable diagnostic technique as ruled by other courts. Additionally, other conditions can still be reliably diagnosed without confirmation of the original insult, such as asbestos and sports-related injuries.

Robert Leslie Roberson III, a resident of Texas sentenced to death for the 2002 murder of his daughter, was convicted on the grounds of shaken baby syndrome, and it was ruled by the courts that his arguments of innocence and the invalid theory of shaken baby syndrome was insufficient to overturn his conviction. He was scheduled to be executed on 17 October 2024, which would have made him the first person to face execution for murder related to shaken baby syndrome. However, the Texas Supreme Court granted a stay of execution to allow his testimony before the Texas House Committee on Criminal Jurisprudence.

== See also ==
- Louise Woodward case
- Jibba Jabber
- Baby Shaker, an iPhone game discontinued to controversy around this syndrome.
