= Virtual Centre of Excellence =

For organizational design, the Virtual Centre of Excellence is a term which has come into use from various sources, including funders such as the European Union.

"A Virtual Center of Excellence is a fairly new organizational concept. Its aim is to bring the capabilities, knowledge and expertise together from diverse teams across geographical and organization boundaries to create something exemplary and distinguishable within its domain"

Examples of Virtual Centers of Excellence include:

- Building the Future Optical Network in Europe (BONE)
- Risk and opportunity management of huge-scale business community cooperation (ROBUST)
- Virtual Center of Excellence for Ethically guided and Privacy-respecting Video Analytics (VIDEOSENSE)
- Alliance for the Permanent Access to the Records of Science in Europe Network (APARSEN)
