= Josh Begley (artist) =

American digital artist

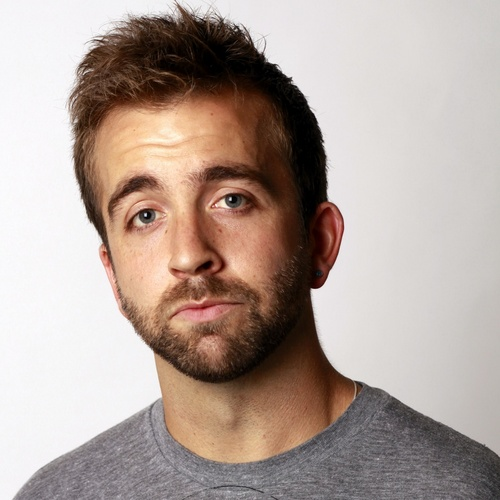
- Born: 1984 (age 41–42); San Francisco, California
- Education: University of California, Berkeley, NYU's Tisch School of the Arts
- Known for: Digital Art, Data Visualization
- Website: joshbegley.com

Josh Begley (born 1984) is an American digital artist known for his data visualizations. He is the creator of Metadata+, an iPhone app that tracked every reported United States drone strike. Begley is the director of two short films, Best of Luck with the Wall (2016) and Concussion Protocol (2018), both produced by Academy Award-winning director Laura Poitras. He is based in Brooklyn, New York.

== History ==
Begley was born in San Francisco, California in 1984. He is a graduate of University of California, Berkeley and the Interactive Telecommunications Program at New York University's Tisch School of the Arts.

Bagley has a history of activism and social advocacy. In July 2012, Begley developed an iPhone application that would send a push notification every time there was a US drone strike in Pakistan, Yemen, or Somalia. Apple rejected the app three times in the months following its release, calling its content "crude and objectionable". Begley then created Dronestream, a Twitter account chronicling every reported US drone strike, for Douglas Rushkoff's Narrative Lab. It gained 15,000 followers in the first week.

In June 2012, Begley and two other New York University graduate students, Mehan Jayasuriya and James Borda, received a cease and desist letter from Invisible Children for their Kony 2012 parody website, Kickstriker.

In 2014, after five rejections, Apple accepted Begley's iPhone app. It was then approved as Metadata+, before once again being removed by Apple, bringing the total number of rejections to 12. He works at The Intercept with journalists Jeremy Scahill, Glenn Greenwald, and Laura Poitras.

== Career ==
Begley is the director of Best of Luck with the Wall (2016), a documentary short about the geography of the U.S.-Mexico border. It was made with 200,000 satellite images downloaded from Google Maps. It received Honorary Mention at 2017 Prix Ars Electronica and was nominated for an ICP Infinity Award.

In 2018, Begley released his second short film, Concussion Protocol (2018), produced by Academy Award-winning director Laura Poitras. The New Yorker called it "a chasteningly gorgeous accounting of each concussion reported during the current N.F.L. season."

He co-taught a class at Columbia Law School in Fall of 2018.

In 2024, Begley and filmmaker Kya Lou co-created an 18-channel video installation for the Whitney Museum of American Art exhibition Edges of Ailey, about the life and legacy of choreographer Alvin Ailey.

== Works ==
- "Dronestream", (December 2012) a Twitter account posting every reported United States drone strike.
- "Officer Involved", (June 2015) a photographic project on police violence, with an introduction by the novelist Teju Cole.
- "Prison Map", (2012) a site using aerial photography to provide a visual representation of the US prison system.
- "Redlining", (2012) an online archive of redlining maps overlaid on California cities.
- "Kickstriker", (2012) a parody site Begley built with classmates Mehan Jayasuriya and James Borda, purporting to crowdfund military interventions in global conflicts.
- "The Listserve", part of a NYU class project built by Begley with Greg Dorsainville, Yoonjo Choi, Alvin Chang and Zena Koo. A listserv-like email list where one randomly selected list member per day can send an email to the entire list.
- "Subject of the Dream", a collage of excerpts from the work of Toni Morrison.
- "Racebox", (2010) a website showing the race section of the United States Census through history, from 1790 to 2010. This project explores historical racial identities in the United States and the relationship between government and race.
- "Empire.is", an interactive map showing the location of known United States military installations around the world.
- "Profiling.is", a visual representation of the Associated Press's probe into the New York Police Department's post-9/11 Muslim surveillance program.
- "Archives + Absences", an iPhone app that notifies users every time the police end someone's life in the United States.
- "The News is Breaking," a visualization of every New York Times front page since 1852.
- "Best of Luck with the Wall," (2016) produced by Laura Poitras, a short film about the geography of the U.S.-Mexico Border.
- "Concussion Protocol," (2018) produced by Laura Poitras, a visual record of every concussion reported during the 2017-2018 NFL season.
