= Retinal haemorrhage =

Bleeding in the retina of the eye

Retinal hemorrhage
- Specialty: Ophthalmology

Retinal hemorrhage (UK English: retinal haemorrhage) is a disorder of the eye in which bleeding occurs in the retina, the light sensitive tissue located on the back wall of the eye. There are photoreceptor cells in the retina called rods and cones, which transduce light energy into nerve signals that can be processed by the brain to form visual images. Retinal hemorrhage is strongly associated with child abuse in infants and young children and often leaves such abused infants permanently blind. In older children and adults, retinal hemorrhage can be caused by several medical conditions such as hypertension, retinal vein occlusion (a blockage of a retinal vein), anemia, leukemia or diabetes.

== Signs and symptoms ==
At the early stage, a retinal hemorrhage may not show any symptom at all.

Some symptoms may include:

- Seeing floaters in the vision
- Seeing cobwebs in the vision
- Seeing haze or shadows
- Distorted vision
- Rapid flashes of light in peripheral vision
- Red tint to vision
- Blurriness
- Sudden blindness
- Headache

== Causes ==
In adults, retinal hemorrhages are largely spontaneous, secondary to chronic medical conditions such as hypertension. They also commonly occur in high altitude climbers, most likely due to the effects of systemic hypoxia on the eye. Risk is correlated with the maximum altitude reached, duration of exposure to high altitude conditions, and climb rate.

In infants, retinal hemorrhages (RH) are highly associated with child abuse. The incidence of RH in abusive head trauma is approximately 85%. In a comprehensive review of 62 studies comprising 998 children, 504 of whom were abused, RH were found in 78% of cases of abusive head trauma (AHT) versus 5% of the cases of non-abusive head trauma. In a child with head trauma and RH, the odds ratio that this is AHT is 14.7 (95% CI 6.39, 33.62) and the probability of abuse is 91%. Where recorded, RH were bilateral in 83% of AHT cases compared to 8.3% in non-abusive cases.

== Diagnosis ==
A retinal hemorrhage is generally diagnosed by using an ophthalmoscope or fundus camera in order to examine the inside of the eye. A fluorescein angiography test may be conducted, in which a fluorescent dye is often injected into the patient's bloodstream beforehand so the administering ophthalmologist can have a more detailed view and examination on the blood vessels in the retina. The fluorescent dye can have dangerous side effects: see Fluorescein

Eye examination may be done to check the eye(s) conditions, for instance to check how well the patient sees straight ahead, off to the sides and at different distances.

Blood tests may provide information about the patient's overall health and may also reveal the medical condition that may have caused retinal hemorrhage.

== Prevention ==
It is recommended to consult with ophthalmologist or optometrist as early as possible, particularly for people with vision problems, these include floaters, flashes, cobwebs or spots in their vision. Preventive measures such as regular prenatal care and monitoring of infants with high risks of the disorder may be done to avoid further complications of retinal hemorrhages in infants. For retinal hemorrhages associated with hypertension, blood pressure can be controlled by having regular blood pressure check ups, frequent exercise, monitor daily food intakes and to practice a stress-free lifestyle.

== Treatment ==
Retinal hemorrhages, especially mild ones not associated with chronic disease, will normally reabsorb without treatment. Laser surgery is a treatment option which uses a laser beam to seal off damaged blood vessels in the retina. Anti-vascular endothelial growth factor (VEGF) drugs like Avastin and Lucentis have also been shown to repair retinal hemorrhaging in diabetic patients and patients with hemorrhages associated with new vessel growth.

Alternative treatments may include providing necessary nutrients to strengthen and heal damaged blood vessels, through the consumption of dietary supplements such as Vitamins A, B, C and E. Also, the essential fatty acids including omega-3 from fish oil and flaxseed oil.

== See also ==
- Visual impairment
