= Eye circles =

Eye circles are distinguished circles around the eyes, caused by either:

- Periorbital dark circles, primarily caused by a lack of sleep and mental fatigue.
- Periorbital puffiness, or swelling around the eyes, primarily caused by fluid buildup around the eyes.

An extreme form is observed in the condition raccoon eyes.

The term may also refer to the limbal rings around the iris.
