= List of signs and symptoms of diving disorders =

Evidence of physiological disorders resulting from underwater diving

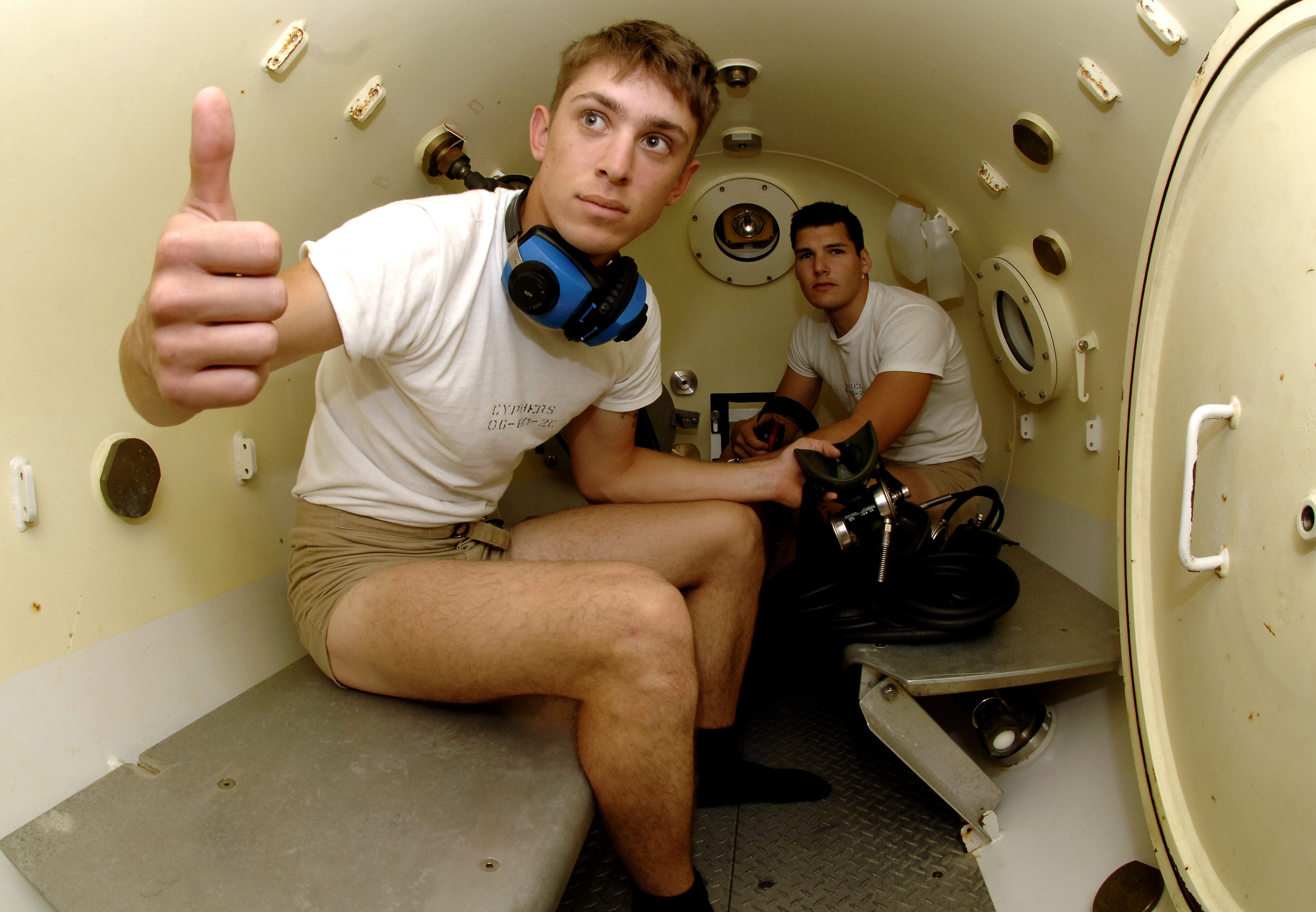
A recompression chamber is used to treat some diving disorders and for training divers to recognise the symptoms.

Diving disorders are medical conditions specifically arising from ambient pressure underwater diving with breathing apparatus. The signs and symptoms of these may present during a dive, on surfacing, or up to several hours after a dive.

The principal conditions are decompression illness (which covers decompression sickness and arterial gas embolism), nitrogen narcosis, high pressure nervous syndrome, oxygen toxicity, and pulmonary barotrauma (burst lung). Although some of these may occur in other settings, they are of particular concern during diving activities.

The disorders are caused by breathing gas at the high pressures encountered at the depth of the water and divers will often breathe a gas mixture different from air to mitigate these effects. Nitrox, which contains more oxygen and less nitrogen, is commonly used as a breathing gas to reduce the risk of decompression sickness at recreational depths (up to 34 meters or 112 feet for 32% oxygen). Helium may be added to reduce the amount of nitrogen and oxygen in the gas mixture when diving deeper, to reduce the effects of narcosis, to avoid the risk of oxygen toxicity, and to reduce work of breathing. This is complicated at depths beyond about 150 metres (500 ft), because a helium–oxygen mixture (heliox) then causes high pressure nervous syndrome. More exotic mixtures such as hydreliox, a hydrogen–helium–oxygen mixture, are used at extreme depths to counteract this.

== Decompression sickness ==
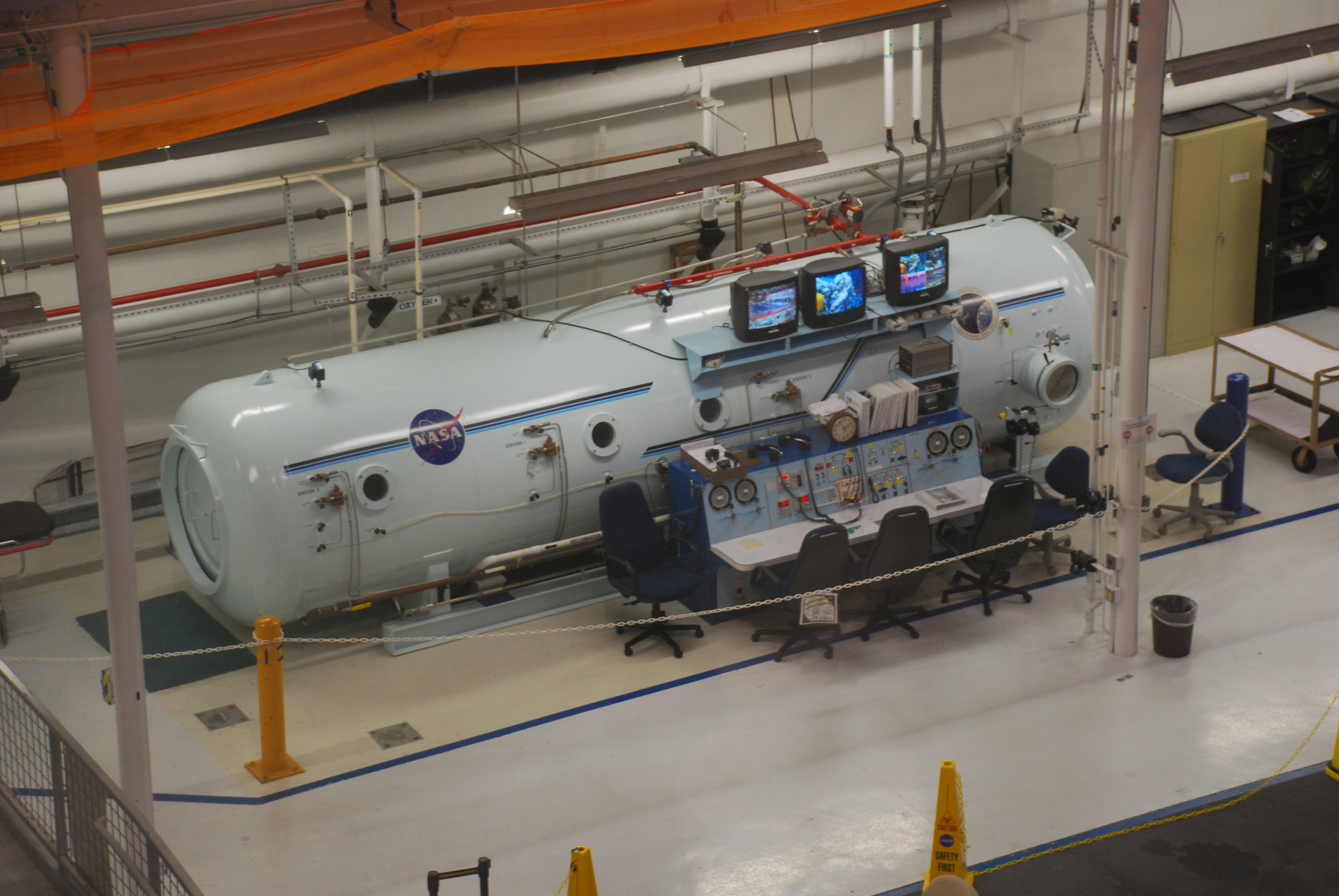
The recompression chamber at the Neutral Buoyancy Laboratory used for treating DCS and training

Decompression sickness (DCS) occurs when gas that has been breathed under high pressure dissolves into the body tissues, thus, forming bubbles as the pressure is reduced on ascent from a dive. The results may range from pain in the joints where the bubbles form to blockage of an artery(air bubble) leading to damage to the fatigue, joint and muscle pain, clouded thinking, numbness, weakness, paralysis, rash, poor muscle coordination or balance, paralysis or death. While bubbles can form anywhere in the body, DCS is most frequently observed in the shoulders, elbows, knees, and ankles. Joint pain occurs in about 90% of DCS cases reported to the U.S. Navy, with neurological symptoms and skin manifestations each present in 10% to 15% of cases. Pulmonary DCS is very rare in divers. The table below classifies the effects by affected organ and bubble location.

Signs and symptoms of decompression sickness
| DCS type | Bubble location | Clinical manifestations |
|---|---|---|
| Musculoskeletal | Mostly large joints | Localised deep pain, ranging from mild to excruciating; sometimes a dull ache, but rarely a sharp pain; Pain aggravated by active and passive motion of the joint; Pain which may be reduced by bending the joint to find a more comfortable position; Pain occurring immediately on surfacing or up to many hours later |
| Cutaneous | Skin | Itching, usually around the ears, face, neck, arms, and upper torso; Sensation of tiny insects crawling over the skin (formication); Mottled or marbled skin or subcutaneous crepitation, usually around the shoulders, upper chest and abdomen, with itching; Swelling of the skin, accompanied by tiny scar-like skin depressions (pitting edema) |
| Neurologic | Brain | Altered sensation, paresthesia (tingling or numbness), hyperesthesia (increased sensitivity); Confusion or memory loss (amnesia); Visual abnormalities; Unexplained mood or behaviour changes; Seizures, unconsciousness |
| Neurologic | Spinal cord | Ascending weakness or paralysis in the legs; Girdling abdominal or chest pain; Urinary incontinence and fecal incontinence |
| Constitutional | Whole body | Headache; Unexplained fatigue; Generalised malaise, poorly localised aches |
| Audiovestibular | Inner ear | Loss of balance; Dizziness, vertigo, nausea, vomiting; Hearing loss |
| Pulmonary | Lungs | Dry persistent cough; Burning chest pain under the sternum, aggravated by breathing; Shortness of breath |

== Arterial gas embolism and pulmonary barotrauma ==
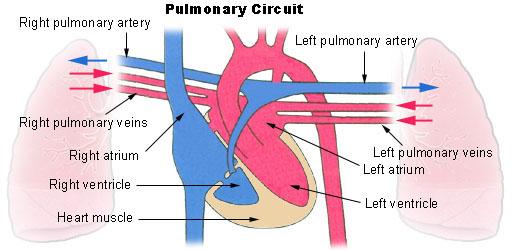
The pulmonary circulation

If the compressed air in a diver's lungs cannot freely escape during an ascent, particularly a rapid one, then the lung tissues may rupture, causing pulmonary barotrauma (PBT). The air may then enter the arterial circulation producing arterial gas embolism (AGE), with effects similar to severe decompression sickness. Although AGE may occur as a result of other causes, it is most often secondary to PBT. AGE is the second most common cause of death while diving (drowning being the most common stated cause of death). Gas bubbles within the arterial circulation can block the supply of blood to any part of the body, including the brain, and can therefore manifest a vast variety of symptoms. The following table presents those signs and symptoms which have been observed in more than ten percent of cases diagnosed as AGE, with approximate estimates of frequency.

Signs and symptoms of arterial gas embolism
| Symptom | Percentage |
|---|---|
| Loss of consciousness | 81 |
| Pulmonary rales or wheezes | 38 |
| Blood in the ear (Hemotympanum) | 34 |
| Decreased reflexes | 34 |
| Extremity weakness or paralysis | 32 |
| Chest pain | 29 |
| Irregular breathing or apnea | 29 |
| Vomiting | 29 |
| Coma without convulsions | 26 |
| Coughing blood (Hemoptysis) | 23 |
| Sensory loss | 21 |
| Stupor and confusion | 18 |
| Vision changes | 20 |
| Cardiac arrest | 16 |
| Headache | 16 |
| Unilateral motor changes | 16 |
| Change in gait or ataxia | 14 |
| Conjunctivitis | 14 |
| Sluggishly reactive pupils | 14 |
| Vertigo | 12 |
| Coma with convulsions | 11 |

Other conditions that can be caused by pulmonary barotrauma include pneumothorax, mediastinal emphysema and interstitial emphysema.

=== Interstitial emphysema ===
Pulmonary interstitial emphysema (PIE) is a relatively rare condition that affects mainly premature babies but can also develop in adults after lung overexpansion.

== Nitrogen narcosis ==
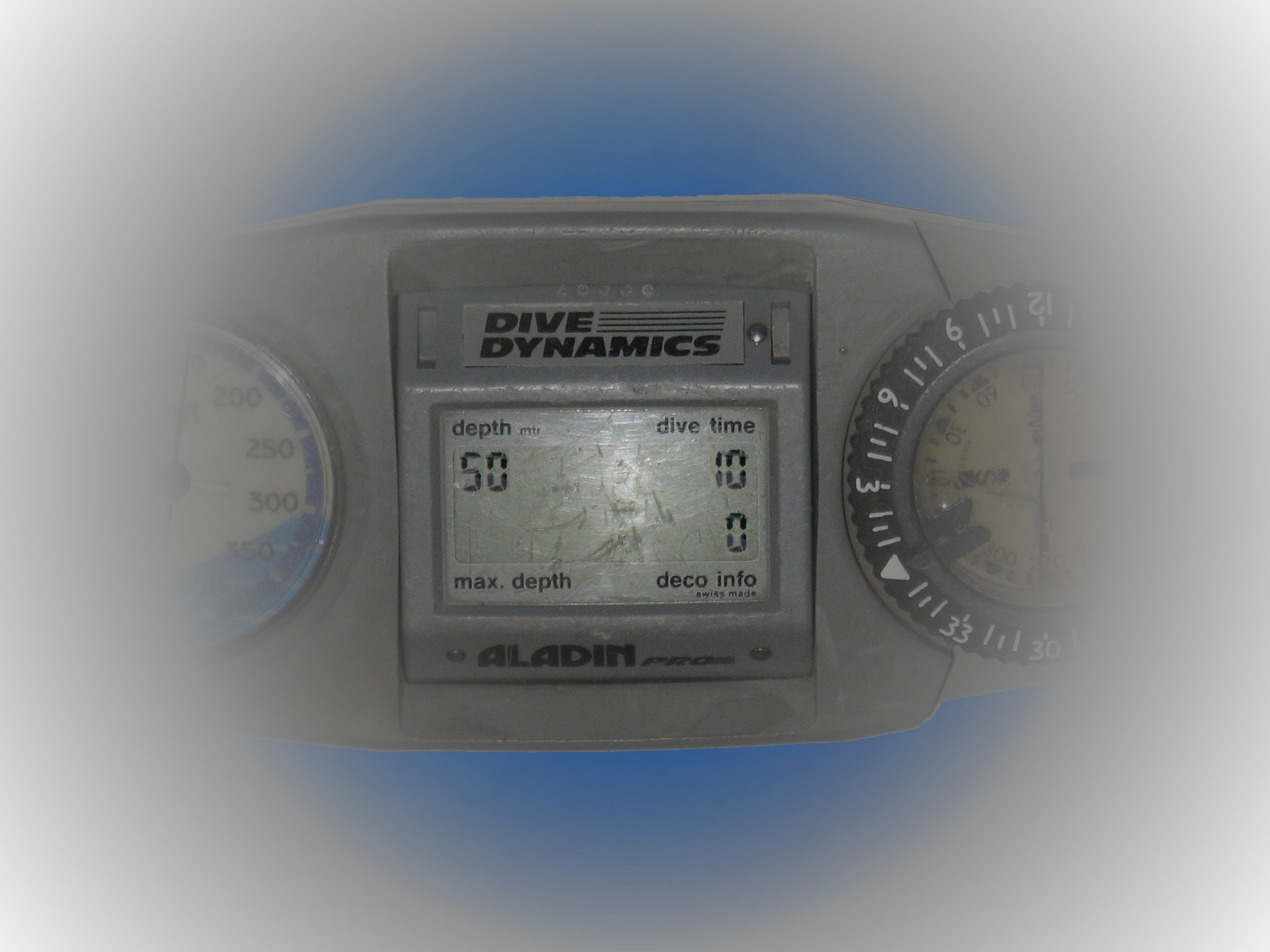
Narcosis can produce tunnel vision, making it difficult to read multiple gauges.

Nitrogen narcosis is a change in consciousness, neuromuscular function, and behavior brought on by breathing compressed inert gasses, most commonly nitrogen. It has also been called depth intoxication, "narks," and rapture of the deep. It can cause a decrease in the diver's ability to make judgements or calculations. It can also decrease motor skills, and worsen performance in tasks requiring manual dexterity. As depth increases, so does the pressure and hence the severity of the narcosis. The effects may vary widely from individual to individual, and from day to day for the same diver. Because of the perception-altering effects of narcosis, a diver may not be aware of the symptoms, but studies have shown that impairment occurs nevertheless. Since the choice of breathing gas also affects the depth at which narcosis occurs, the table below represents typical manifestations when breathing air.

Signs and symptoms of narcosis
| Pressure (bar) | Depth (m) | Depth (ft) | Manifestations |
|---|---|---|---|
| 1–2 | 0–10 | 0–33 | Unnoticeable small symptoms, or no symptoms at all |
| 2–4 | 10–30 | 33–100 | Mild impairment of performance of unpracticed tasks; Mildly impaired reasoning; Mild euphoria possible |
| 4–6 | 30–50 | 100–165 | Delayed response to visual and auditory stimuli; Reasoning and immediate memory affected more than motor coordination; Calculation errors and wrong choices; Idea fixation; Overconfidence and sense of well-being; Laughter and loquacity which may be overcome by self-control; Anxiety (common in cold murky water) |
| 6–8 | 50–70 | 165–230 | Sleepiness, impaired judgment, confusion; Hallucinations; Severe delay in response to signals, instructions and other stimuli; Occasional dizziness; Uncontrolled laughter, hysteria; Terror in some |
| 8–10 | 70–90 | 230–300 | Poor concentration and mental confusion; Stupefaction with some decrease in dexterity and judgment; Loss of memory, increased excitability |
| 10+ | 90+ | 300+ | Hallucinations; Increased intensity of vision and hearing (Hyperesthesia); Sense of impending blackout, euphoria, dizziness; Manic or depressive states; A sense of levitation and disorganisation of the sense of time; Changes in facial appearance; Unconsciousness, death |

== High pressure nervous syndrome ==
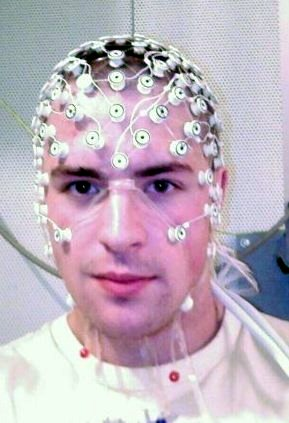
An EEG recording net

Helium is the least narcotic of all gases, and divers may use breathing mixtures containing a proportion of helium for dives exceeding about 40 metres (130 ft) deep. In the 1960s it was expected that helium narcosis would begin to become apparent at depths of 300 metres (1,000 ft). However, it was found that different symptoms, such as tremors, occurred at shallower depths around 150 metres (500 ft). This became known as high pressure nervous syndrome, and its effects are found to result from both the absolute depth and the speed of descent. Although the effects vary from person to person, they are stable and reproducible for each individual; the list below summarizes the symptoms observed underwater and in studies using simulated dives in the dry, using recompression chambers and electroencephalography (EEG) monitors.

Signs and symptoms of HPNS
| Symptom | Notes |
|---|---|
| Impairment | Both intellectual and motor performance are impaired. A 20% decrease in the ability to perform calculations and in manual dexterity is observed at 180 metres (600 ft), rising to 40% at depths of 240 metres (800 ft) |
| Dizziness | Vertigo, nausea, and vomiting may occur in divers at depths of 180 metres (600 ft). Animal studies under more extreme conditions have produced convulsions. |
| Tremors | Tremors of the hands, arms and torso are observed from 130 metres (400 ft) onward. The tremors occur with a frequency in the range of 5–8 hertz (Hz), and their severity is related to the speed of compression; the tremors reduce and may disappear when the pressure has stabilised. |
| EEG changes | At depths exceeding 300 metres (1,000 ft), changes in the electroencephalogram (EEG) are observed; the appearance of theta waves (4–6 Hz) and depression of alpha waves (8–13 Hz). |
| Somnolence | At depths beyond the onset of EEG changes, test subjects intermittently fall asleep, with sleep stages 1 and 2 observed in the EEG. Even when decompressed to shallower depths, the effect continues for 10–12 hours. |

== Oxygen toxicity ==
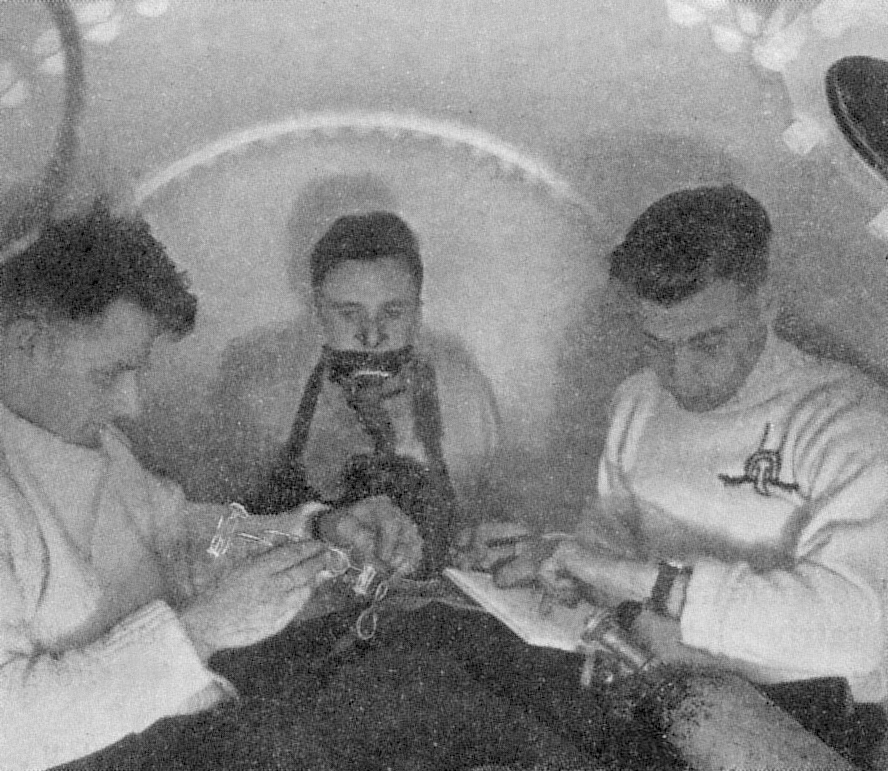
During World War II Professor Kenneth Donald carried out extensive testing for oxygen toxicity in divers. The chamber is pressurised with air to 3.7 bars (370 kPa; 54 psi). The subject in the centre is breathing 100% oxygen from a mask.

Although oxygen is essential to life, in concentrations greater than normal it becomes toxic, overcoming the body's natural defences (antioxidants), and causing cell death in any part of the body. The lungs and brain are particularly affected by high partial pressures of oxygen, such as are encountered in diving. The body can tolerate partial pressures of oxygen around 0.5 bars (50 kPa; 7.3 psi) indefinitely, and up to 1.4 bars (140 kPa; 20 psi) for many hours, but higher partial pressures rapidly increase the chance of the most dangerous effect of oxygen toxicity, a convulsion resembling an epileptic seizure. Susceptibility to oxygen toxicity varies dramatically from person to person, and to a much smaller extent from day to day for the same diver. Prior to convulsion, several symptoms may be present – most distinctly that of an aura.

During 1942 and 1943, Professor Kenneth W Donald, working at the Admiralty Experimental Diving Unit, carried out over 2,000 experiments on divers to examine the effects of oxygen toxicity. To date, no comparable series of studies has been performed. In one seminal experiment, Donald exposed 36 healthy divers to 3.7 bars (370 kPa; 54 psi) of oxygen in a chamber, equivalent to breathing pure oxygen at a depth of 27 metres (90 ft), and recorded the time of onset of various signs and symptoms. Five of the subjects convulsed, and the others recovered when returned to normal pressure following the appearance of acute symptoms. The table below summarises the results for the relative frequency of the symptoms, and the earliest and latest time of onset, as observed by Donald. The wide variety of symptoms and large variability of onset between individuals typical of oxygen toxicity are clearly illustrated.

Signs and symptoms of oxygen toxicity observed in 36 subjects
| Signs and symptoms | Frequency | Earliest onset (minutes) | Latest onset (minutes) |
|---|---|---|---|
| Lip-twitching | 25 | 6 | 67 |
| Vertigo | 5 | 9 | 62 |
| Convulsion | 5 | 20 | 33 |
| Nausea | 4 | 6 | 62 |
| Spasmodic respiration | 3 | 16 | 17 |
| Dazed | 2 | 9 | 51 |
| Syncope | 2 | 15 | 16 |
| Epigastric aura | 2 | 18 | 23 |
| Arm twitch | 2 | 21 | 62 |
| Dazzle | 2 | 51 | 96 |
| Diaphragmatic spasm | 1 | 7 | 7 |
| Tingling | 1 | 9 | 9 |
| Confusion | 1 | 15 | 15 |
| Inspiratory predominance (Note: Normally, breathing in takes less time than breathing out; inspiratory predominance is a reversal of this.) | 1 | 16 | 16 |
| Amnesia | 1 | 21 | 21 |
| Drowsiness | 1 | 26 | 26 |
| Fell asleep | 1 | 51 | 51 |
| Euphoria | 1 | 62 | 62 |
| Vomiting | 1 | 96 | 96 |

== Compression arthralgia ==
Compression arthralgia is pain in the joints caused by exposure to high ambient pressure at a relatively high rate of compression, experienced by underwater divers. Also referred to in the U.S. Navy Diving Manual as compression pains.

Onset commonly occurs around 60 msw (meters of sea water), and symptoms are variable depending on depth, compression rate and personal susceptibility. Intensity increases with depth and may be aggravated by exercise. Compression arthralgia is generally a problem of deep diving, particularly deep saturation diving, where at sufficient depth even slow compression may produce symptoms. Peter B. Bennett et al. (1974) found that the use of trimix could reduce the symptoms. The pain may be sufficiently severe to limit the diver's capacity for work, and may also limit travel rate and depth of downward excursions in saturation diving. he mechanism of compression arthralgia is not known, and symptoms generally resolve during decompression and require no further treatment.

=== Symptoms ===
Compression arthralgia has been recorded as deep aching pain in the knees, shoulders, fingers, back, hips, neck and ribs. Pain may be sudden and intense in onset and may be accompanied by a feeling of roughness in the joints.

Fast compression (descent) may produce symptoms as shallow as 30 msw.

Saturation divers generally compress much more slowly, and symptoms are unlikely at less than around 90 msw. At depths beyond 180m even very slow compression may produce symptoms.

Spontaneous improvement may occur over time at depth, but this is unpredictable, and pain may persist into decompression.

Symptoms may be distinguished from decompression sickness as they are present before starting decompression, and resolve with decreasing pressure, the opposite of decompression sickness.
