= William Battle =

William Battle may refer to:

- Bill Battle (born 1941), American football coach
- William Henry Battle (1855–1936), English surgeon
- William Horn Battle (1802–1879), American jurist and law professor
- William C. Battle (1920–2008), American diplomat, lawyer and businessman
