= Richard Battle =

English plastic surgeon

Lieutenant-Colonel Richard Battle MBE FRCS

Consultant in Plastic Surgery to the British Army
- In office 1955–1971

Personal details
- Born: Richard John Vulliamy Battle; 21 January 1907
- Died: 26 May 1982 (aged 75)
- Occupation: Plastic surgeon

Richard John Vulliamy Battle (21 January 1907 – 26 May 1982) was an English plastic surgeon.

== Early life ==
The son of William Henry Battle and Anna Marguerite (née Vulliamy). Battle was educated at Gresham's School, Norfolk, and Trinity College, Cambridge. His father's family (Battle) were farmers in Potterhanworth and owners of a pharmaceutical chemist business in Lincolnshire.

== Career ==
Following service as a military plastic surgeon during the Second World War for which he was awarded the MBE, Battle was appointed as Consultant Plastic Surgeon to St Thomas Hospital, London, the Westminster Hospital, London, and Queen Elizabeth Hospital(Hackney), London, which he served until his retirement from the NHS in 1972. He also had a small private practice in London. He was Honorary Consultant in Plastic Surgery to the British Army from 1955 to 1971 and President of the British Association of Plastic Surgeons for 1952 and again for 1967.

== Military service ==
Before 1939, he was a member of the Territorial Army and served the War of 1939–1945 in the RAMC. France, 1939–40, Italy, 1943–46. Commanded No. 1 Maxillo Facial Unit and 98 General Hospital. Promoted Major, 1940, and Lieutenant-Colonel, 1945.

== Publications ==
- Plastic Surgery (1964)
- Many contributions on plastic surgery to scientific periodicals

== Professional qualifications ==
- 1928: Bachelor of Arts (Cantab.)
- 1931: MRCS and LRCP
- 1935: MCh (Cantab.)
- 1933: FRCS
- 1935: MA (Cantab.)

== Honours ==
- 1945: Member of the Order of the British Empire
- 1970: Gillies Gold Medal

== Family ==
Battle's father was the surgeon William Henry Battle. His father's family (Battle) were farmers in Potterhanworth and owners of a pharmaceutical chemist business in Lincolnshire. In 1941, Battle married Jessie Margaret King, and they had three sons.

== See also ==
- William Henry Battle
