= Battle's sign =

Bruises behind the ears, indicating skull fracture

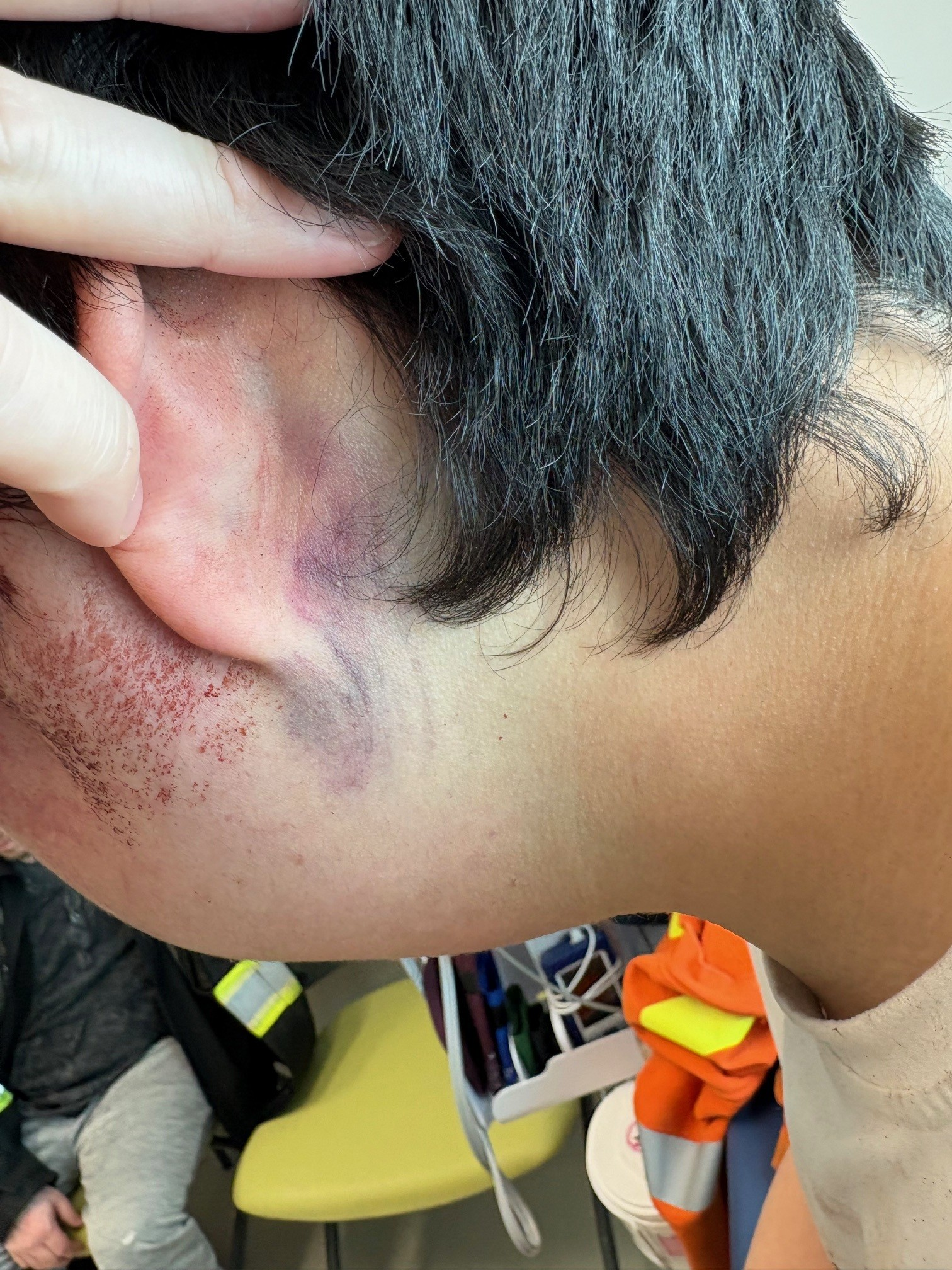
- Differential diagnosis: indication of fracture of middle cranial fossa of the skull

Battle's sign, also known as mastoid ecchymosis or Postauricular ecchymosis, is a late indication of fracture of middle cranial fossa of the skull, appearing as bruising over one or both of the mastoid processes at least one day after the injury. Such fractures can be associated with underlying brain trauma, as they appear as a result of extravasation of blood along the path of the posterior auricular artery. The sign is named after William Henry Battle.

Battle's sign is considered a late sign, as it takes at least one day to appear after the initial traumatic basilar skull fracture, similar to raccoon eyes. Battle's sign may be confused with a spreading hematoma from a fracture of the mandibular condyle, which is a less serious injury.

Signs of break in the base of the skull may include blood or cerebrospinal fluid can leak from the nose or ear

Bruising behind the ears or around the eyes, or blood behind the ear drum.

== See also ==
- Basilar skull fracture
- Raccoon eyes
- Black eye
