= Raccoon eyes =

Bruising of the eye orbits, indicating skull fracture or internal bleeding

- Other names: Panda eyes, periorbital ecchymosis
- Bilateral raccoon eyes with CSF leak
- Specialty: Neurosurgery
- Causes: Le Fort 2 and 3 fracture

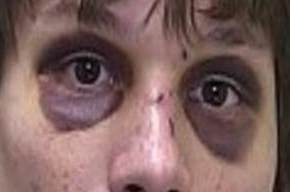
Bilateral raccoon eyes

Raccoon eyes, also known as panda eyes or periorbital ecchymosis, is a sign of basilar skull fracture or subgaleal hematoma, a craniotomy that ruptured the meninges, or (rarely) certain cancers. Bilateral hemorrhage occurs when damage at the time of a facial fracture tears the meninges and causes the venous sinuses to bleed into the arachnoid villi and the cranial sinuses. In lay terms, blood from skull fracture seeps into the soft tissue around the eyes. Raccoon eyes may be accompanied by Battle's sign, an ecchymosis behind the ear. These signs may be the only sign of a skull fracture, as it may not show on an X-ray. They normally appear between 48 and 72 hours (2-3 days) after the injury. It is recommended that the patient not blow their nose, cough vigorously, or strain, to prevent further tearing of the meninges.

Raccoon eyes may be bilateral or unilateral. If unilateral, it is highly suggestive of basilar skull fracture, with a positive predictive value of 85%. They are most often associated with fractures of the anterior cranial fossa.

Raccoon eyes may also be a sign of disseminated neuroblastoma, amyloidosis, Kaposi's sarcoma or multiple myeloma. It also can be temporary result of rhinoplasty.

Depending on cause, raccoon eyes always require urgent consultation and management, whether surgical (facial fracture or post-craniotomy) or medical (neuroblastoma or amyloidosis).

== See also ==
- Battle's sign
- Periorbital dark circles
- Periorbital puffiness
