= Hemotympanum =

Presence of blood in the tympanic cavity of the middle ear

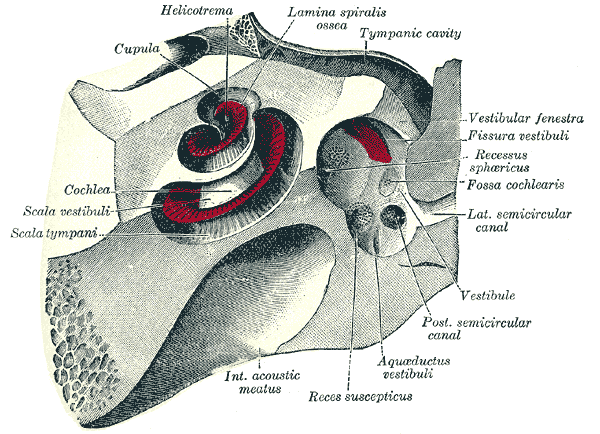
Tympanic cavity

Hemotympanum, or hematotympanum, refers to the presence of blood in the tympanic cavity of the middle ear. Hemotympanum is often the result of basilar skull fracture.

Hemotympanum refers to the presence of blood in the middle ear, which is the area behind the eardrum. In most cases, the blood is trapped behind the eardrum, so no discharge is visible.

Treating hemotympanum depends on the underlying cause.

== Presentation ==
The most common symptoms of hemotympanum are pain, a sense of fullness in the ear, and hearing loss.

== Causes ==
=== Skull fracture ===
A basal skull fracture is a fracture in one of the bones at the base of the skull. This is almost always caused by impact trauma such as a hard fall or a car crash. If the temporal bone is affected, one of the following may co-occur:

- Auricular cerebrospinal fluid discharge
- Dizziness
- Bruises around the eyes or behind the ears
- Facial weakness
- Difficulty seeing, smelling, or hearing

=== Nasal packing ===
Following nasal surgery or frequent nosebleeds, gauze or cotton may be inserted into the nose to stop the bleeding. This process is called therapeutic nasal packing. Nasal packing sometimes causes blood to back up into the middle ear, causing hemotympanum. Removing the packing may allow the blood to drain from the ear. Antibiotics can prevent an ear infection.

=== Bleeding disorders ===
Bleeding disorders, such as hemophilia or idiopathic thrombocytopenia purpura, can also cause hemotympanum. These disorders prevent proper blood clotting. In that circumstance, a mild head injury or a strong sneeze can cause hemotympanum.

=== Anticoagulant medications ===
Anticoagulants, often called blood thinners, are medications that keep blood from clotting too easily. In rare cases, anticoagulants can cause hemotympanum with no underlying cause or injury. Experiencing a head injury while taking anticoagulants, increases the likelihood of hemotympanum.

=== Ear infections ===
Frequent ear infections, ongoing inflammation and fluid buildup can increase the risk of hemotympanum.

== Treatment ==
Skull fractures usually heal on their own, but they can also cause several complications. Cerebrospinal fluid leaking out of the ear involves a higher risk of developing meningitis. Treatment may include corticosteroids, antibiotics, or surgery.
