= Black eye =

Bruising injury to the face

- Other names: Periorbital hematoma
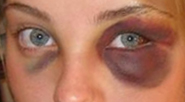
- Specialty: Emergency medicine

A periorbital hematoma, commonly called a black eye or a shiner (associated with boxing or stick sports such as hockey), is bruising around the eye commonly due to an injury to the face rather than to the eye. The name refers to the dark-colored bruising which is the result of accumulated blood and fluid in the loose areolar tissue following a blow to the head. This blood tracks freely under the scalp producing a generalised swelling over the dome of the skull but cannot pass into either occipital or the temple regions because of the bony attachments of the occipitofrontalis muscle. But this fluid can, however, track forward into the eyelid because the occipitofrontalis muscle has no bony attachment anteriorly. This leads to formation of hematoma a few hours after the head injury or cranial operation. If injury is more extensive, potentially even a skull fracture, an apparent black eye can sometimes worsen and may require professional medical treatment before it will resolve. This is more likely if the area around both eyes has been injured (raccoon eyes) or if there is a history of prior head injury or fracture around the eye. Though disfiguring, the vast majority of black eyes are not serious, require little or no treatment, and will resolve spontaneously within a week or two.

Bleeding within the eye, a condition called a hyphema, is more serious: it can permanently reduce vision and can damage the cornea. In some cases, abnormally high pressure inside the eyeball (ocular hypertension) can also result.

== Signs and symptoms ==
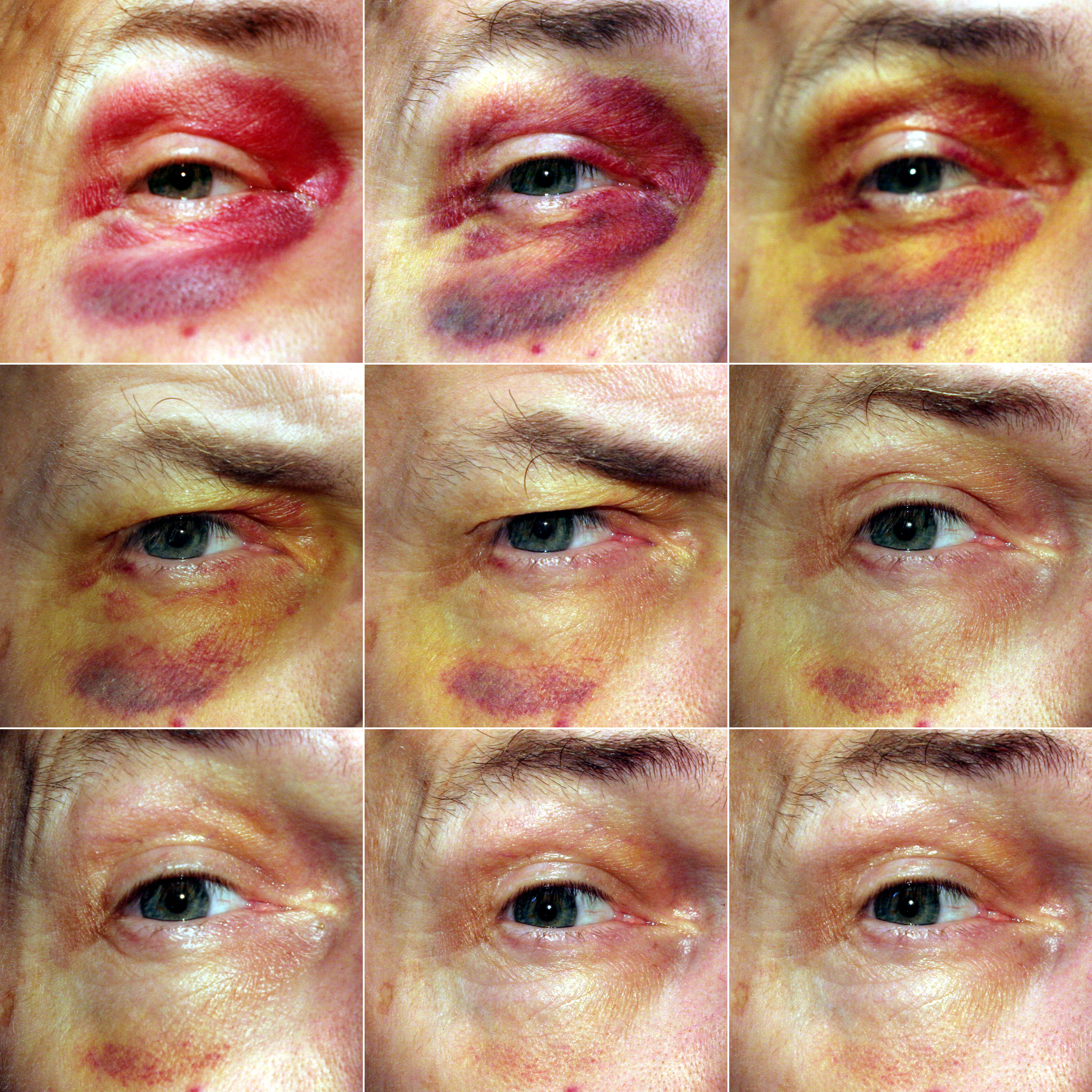
Progression of periorbital hematoma over ten days: the blood is gradually absorbed, but the iron-laden pigments in the blood remain in the tissue leaving a discoloration that persists for longer.

Despite the name, the eye itself is not affected. Blunt force or trauma to the eye socket results in burst capillaries and subsequent haemorrhaging (hematoma). The fatty tissue along with the lack of muscle around the eye socket allows a potential space for blood accumulation. As this blood decomposes and is resorbed, various pigments are released lending itself to the extreme outward appearance.

The appearance (discoloration in purple and blue along with swelling) does not usually indicate a serious injury, and most black eyes resolve within a week. The tissues around the eye are soft and thus bruise easily when compressed against margins of bone which surround and protect the eye socket. The treatment is the same as that for bruises in other parts of the body – cold compresses during the first twenty-four hours. During the process of healing, and so long as there no breaks in the skin, a black eye can be made less conspicuous by using cosmetics designed to obscure discolorations of the skin. In a severe contusion, blowout of the floor of the orbit may occur, leading to double vision. Such an injury may require surgical correction.

=== Associated conditions ===
Eye injury and head trauma may also coincide with a black eye. Some common signs of a more serious injury may include:

- Double vision
- Loss of sight and/or fuzzy vision could occur
- Unconsciousness
- Inability to move the eye or large swelling around the eye
- Blood or clear fluid from the nose or the ears
- Blood on the surface of the eye itself or cuts on the eye itself
- Persistent headache or migraine

== Treatment ==
Unless there is actual trauma to the eye itself (see below), extensive medical attention is generally not needed.

Applying an ice pack will keep down swelling and reduce internal bleeding by constricting the capillaries. Analgesic drugs (painkillers) can be administered to relieve pain.

An anecdotal remedy for a black eye consists of applying raw meat to the eye area. Research has yet to find any evidence of this treatment being effective. Likely the raw meat was used when ice packs were not yet commercially available and meat was stored in iceboxes instead of in a protective gas. While cold but not freezing, meat is more gentle to the skin than ice and will not damage the surface of the skin as the skin temperature cannot go below freezing even in extreme cases. Meat is also soft and comes easier into contact with the skin than blocks of ice that were available.
