= Periorbital puffiness =

Appearance of swelling around the eyes

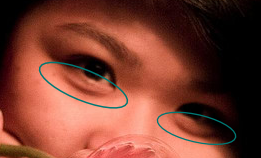
Eye bags – minor periorbital puffiness usually detectable below the eyes only.

Periorbital edema.

Periorbital puffiness, also known as puffy eyes, or swelling around the eyes, is the appearance of swelling in the tissues around the eyes, called the orbits. It is almost exclusively caused by fluid buildup around the eyes, or periorbital edema. Minor puffiness usually detectable below the eyes only is often called eye bags. Such transient puffiness is distinct from the age related and gradual increase in the size of the fat pad lying below the lower eyelids (suborbicularis oculi fat) which can also be colloquially referred to as eye bags. Puffiness under the lower eyelid to upper cheeks are referred to as festoons or Malar mounds.

== Causes ==
While some degree of puffiness may be normal for a given individual, factors such as age and fatigue may make the swelling more prominent. The periorbital tissues are most noticeably swollen immediately after waking, perhaps due to the gravitational redistribution of fluid in the horizontal position.

Eye puffiness may also be caused by:

- Normal aging – As a person grows older, the skin around the eyes becomes thinner and may swell or droop. Further a gradual and generally permanent increase in the size of the suborbicularis oculi fat pad along with the thinning and weakening of the overlying musculature contributes to the apparent distention of the lower eyelids.
- Allergic reaction - This is the most common cause of swelling around the eyes (notably angioedema). With this cause, one or both eyes can't open due to hardened pressure of fluid.
- Crying – The salt in tears may cause fluid retention in the eye area.
- Hypothyroidism – Facial puffiness and periorbital swelling occur due to infiltration with the mucopolysaccharides hyaluronic acid and chondroitin sulfate, pulling fluid into the interstitial space by osmosis.
- Periorbital cellulitis – An inflammation and infection of the eyelid and portions of skin around the eye.
- Blepharochalasis – An immune-mediated inflammation of the eyelid that is characterized by exacerbations and remissions of eyelid edema which results in a stretching and subsequent atrophy of the eyelid tissue, leading to the formation of redundant folds over the lid margins. It typically affects only the upper eyelids, and may be unilateral as well as bilateral.
- Chagas disease – Also known as American trypanosomiasis. Young patients, often in an acute phase of the disease, manifest Romaña's sign: unilateral, painless, periorbital edema.
- Cavernous sinus syndrome polyneuropathy.
- Mononucleosis – With supra-orbital oedema, the eyes become puffy and swollen. This may occur in the early stages of infection.
- Sleep deprivation – Interrupted sleep cycles are common causes of eye puffiness.
- Fluid retention – Many conditions (including pregnancy and hormonal variations with menstruation) can lead to the retention of fluid, particularly in the subcutaneous tissues. These conditions can cause swelling around the eyes to be more prominent. (This cause can by partly alleviated by raising the head of one's bed.)
- Diet – Too much dietary sodium encourages fluid retention and may lead to puffy eyes.
- Alcohol and tobacco use – Alcohol and tobacco may lead to stress, fatigue, and hormonal changes; all of which may lead to fluid retention and swelling around the eyes.
- Allergies – Allergic reactions can lead to leaks in the subcutaneous capillary beds which can cause swelling in the face, including around the eyes.
- Skin disorders – Eye puffiness can be a side effect of certain skin disorders, such as dermatitis, if the affected area becomes very sensitive, leading to swelling.
- Nephrotic syndrome – Puffiness around the eyes is the first site to get swollen.
- Trichinosis – Periorbital edema, fever and muscle pain are the main symptoms that ensue from eating raw, infected pork.
- Tear glands – Puffiness around the eyes can also be due to the improper functioning of the tear glands.
- Superior vena cava obstruction.

== Risks ==
Puffy eyes are usually only a temporary cosmetic worry, but occasionally, individuals become concerned about the cosmetic effect of periorbital swelling and seek surgical correction. Severe and persistent puffiness may be a sign of other serious medical conditions.

== Prevention ==
Elevating the head while sleeping can prevent the gravitational redistribution of fluid that is associated with eye swelling.

== Treatment ==
For someone predisposed to eye puffiness, changes to diet and lifestyle (under the supervision of a physician) may be required to reduce the possibility of swelling.

A cold compress near the eye can act as a short-term remedy as cold temperature constricts blood vessels, preventing the flow of fluid into tissues and diminishing puffiness in the process.

== See also ==
- Angioedema, rapid swelling of the dermis, subcutaneous tissue, mucosa and submucosal tissues
- Periorbital dark circles
