= Periorbital dark circles =

Dark blemishes around the eyes

- Other names: Dark circles, infraorbital venous stasis, periorbital hyperpigmentation
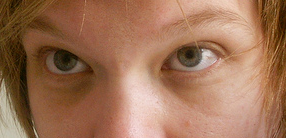
- Minor dark circles and a hint of periorbital puffiness—a combination principally suggestive of minor sleep deprivation.
- Specialty: Sleep medicine

Periorbital dark circles (including dark circles of the lower eyelid) are dark blemishes around the eyes. There are many causes of this symptom, including heredity and bruising.

== Causes ==
=== Anatomical factors ===
Bony structure and prominence of the orbicularis oculi muscle can contribute to infraorbital dark circles. Skin in the lower eyelid is very thin which accentuates subdermal features.

=== Allergies, asthma, and eczema ===
Any condition that causes the eyes to itch can contribute to darker circles due to rubbing or scratching the skin around them. Hay fever sufferers in particular will notice under-eye "smudges" during the height of the allergy season. Atopy can lead to frequent rubbing of the eyes, leading to local inflammation and increased pigmentation.

Also, dark circles from allergies are caused by superficial venous congestion in the capillaries under the eyes.

=== Medications ===
Any medications that cause blood vessels to dilate can cause circles under the eyes to darken, as well as the abstinence or rebound from vasoconstrictors. The skin under the eyes is very delicate, any increased blood flow shows through the skin.

=== Cortisol deficiency ===
When cortisol is deficient the pituitary compensates by producing excess adrenocorticotropic hormone (ACTH) and melanocyte-stimulating hormone (MSH), the latter resulting in dark circles under the eyes.

=== Anemia ===
The lack of nutrients in the diet, or the lack of a balanced diet, can contribute to the discoloration of the area under the eyes. It is believed that iron deficiency and vitamin B_{12} deficiency can cause dark circles as well. Iron deficiency is the most common type of anemia and this condition is a sign that not enough oxygen is getting to the body tissues.

The skin can also become more pale during pregnancy and menstruation (due to lack of iron), allowing the underlying veins under the eyes to become more visible.

=== Fatigue ===
A lack of sleep and mental fatigue can cause paleness of the skin, allowing the blood underneath the skin to become more visible and appear bluer or darker.

=== Age ===
Dark circles are likely to become more noticeable and permanent with age. This is because as people get older, their skin loses collagen, becoming thinner and more translucent. As facial fat descends and fat volume decreases, the somewhat inflexible ligaments can result in orbital rim and facial hollowing. Photoaging has similar effects. Hemoglobin breakdown products such as hemosiderin and biliverdin can leak from the vascular contributing to pigmentation changes.

Circles may also gradually begin to appear darker in one eye than the other as a result of some habitual facial expressions, such as an uneven smile.

=== Sun exposure ===
Sunlight causes the skin to produce more melanin, the pigment that darkens skin.

=== Periorbital hyperpigmentation ===
Periorbital hyperpigmentation occurs when more melanin is produced around the eyes than usual, giving them a darker color.

== Treatment ==
At one time, hydroquinone solution was often mixed in an oil-free moisturizer that acted like a skin bleach. However, the use of hydroquinone for skin whitening has been banned in European countries due to health concerns. In 2006, the United States Food and Drug Administration revoked its approval of hydroquinone for over the counter preparations, warning that it may cause cancer or have many other detrimental effects. The use of hydroquinone skin-whitening products may be toxic, harmful, or lethal for humans.

Modern treatments include topical creams that are marketed for the condition. Various ingredients have been researched, developed and included in these creams. Specialist treatments including laser and intense pulsed light skin surgery can also be used. Low-level laser therapy, autologous fat transplantation and hyaluronic acid fillers are also alternative treatment options.

In addition, many skin care ingredients can help in the form of eye creams. Caffeine is a potent vasoconstrictor that has been proven to improve the look of dark circles by constricting, or tightening, the dilated vessels under eyes. Vitamin C can help brighten hyperpigmentation as well as thicken the dermal layer of skin which conceals dark circles.

== See also ==
- Periorbital puffiness
