= Pediatric ependymoma =

Type of tumor

Pediatric ependymomas are similar in nature to the adult form of ependymoma in that they are thought to arise from radial glial cells lining the ventricular system. However, they differ from adult ependymomas in which genes and chromosomes are most often affected, the region of the brain they are most frequently found in, and the prognosis of the patients. Children with certain hereditary diseases, such as neurofibromatosis type II (NF2), have been found to be more frequently afflicted with this class of tumors, but a firm genetic link remains to be established. Symptoms associated with the development of pediatric ependymomas are varied, much like symptoms for a number of other pediatric brain tumors including vomiting, headache, irritability, lethargy, and changes in gait. Although younger children and children with invasive tumor types generally experience less favorable outcomes, total removal of the tumors is the most conspicuous prognostic factor for both survival and relapse.

== Basic biology ==
=== Cell of origin ===
Ependymomas are believed to arise from radial glial cells. Tumorspheres derived from ependymomas display a radial-glial like phenotype, expressing neuronal stem cell markers CD133 and nestin, as well as radial glial specific markers RC2 and brain lipid binding protein (BLBP/FABP7). Tumorspheres with radial glial characteristics form tumors in orthotopic mouse xenografts, suggesting radial glial as cell of origin for ependymomas.

=== Inheritance ===
A number of genetic syndromes are associated with the development of ependymoma, including neurofibromatosis type II (NF2), Turcot syndrome B, and MEN1 syndrome. However, gene mutations linked to the familial syndromes are rarely found in sporadic cases of ependymoma. For example, NF2 mutations have rarely been observed in ependymomas and MEN1 mutations have only been found in a small number of cases of ependymoma recurrences.

=== Oncogenic lesions ===
ERBB2, ERBB4, and human telomerase reverse transcriptase (TERT) gene expression promote tumor cell proliferation, contributing to aggressive tumor behavior. High expression of epidermal growth factor receptor (EGFR) correlates with unfavorable outcome. Over-expression of kinetochore proteins and down-regulation of metallothioneins are associated with recurrence in ependymomas. KIT receptor tyrosine kinase and phospho-KIT were found to be present in pediatric ependymomas and may be involved in angiogenesis associated with those tumors.

=== Chromosomal changes ===
Comparative genomic hybridization (CGH) experiments have shown pediatric ependymomas possess a number of genomic anomalies not seen in adult ependymomas. In addition, ependymomas from different locations within the central nervous system (spinal, supratentorial, and infratentorial) can be distinguished by their chromosomal, immunohistochemical, and gene expression differences.

Amplification of chromosome 1q and loss of 6q, 17p and 22q are the most common numerical chromosomal changes in pediatric ependymomas. Gain of chromosome 1q (1q21.1-32.1) is more common in the pediatric population and is associated with tumor recurrence in intracranial ependymomas. Moreover, gain of chromosome 1q25 has been found to independent prognostic value for recurrence-free and overall survival. Loss of 22q has been found in both sporadic and familial cases, supporting the presence of a tumor suppressor gene at this location. However, loss of 22q is more common in the adult form than pediatric cases. As NF2 is located on 22q12.2, it was hypothesized to be involved in the development of ependymoma. Though mutations in NF2 are rarely found in sporadic ependymomas other than the spinal form, SCHIP1, a NF2 interacting gene, is significantly down-regulated in pediatric ependymomas, supporting a role for the NF2 pathway in the initiation of ependymomas.

=== Oncogenes and tumor suppressor genes ===
A variety of oncogenes and tumor suppressor genes have been found to be mutated or possess altered expression in pediatric ependymomas. KIT receptor tyrosine kinase and phospho-KIT have been suggested to play a role in the development of pediatric ependymomas, NOTCH1 mutations have been found in approximately 8% of pediatric ependymomas, and MEN1 mutations are occasionally found in pediatric ependymomas. MMP2 and MMP14 appear to also play a role in tumor growth and progression in intracranial cases. Two candidate genes, TPR and CBY1, have been identified on commonly altered chromosome regions in pediatric ependymomas, chromosomes 1q25 and chromosome 22q12-q13. Expression of two additional candidate genes, S100A6 and S100A4 on chromosome 1q have also been found to correspond to supratentorial tumor development and tumors occurring before the age of 3 years old, though it is unclear exactly what role these genes play in the etiology.

=== Tumor progression ===
Ependymomas have been suggested to arise from radial glial cells, suggesting neural stem cell maintenance pathways such as Notch, sonic hedgehog (SHH), and p53 are important for the pathogenesis of ependymomas.

Notch signaling pathway and HOX family of transcription factors are up regulated in supratentorial and spinal ependymomas respectively. Over-expression of Notch ligands, receptors, and target genes (HES1, HEY2, and MYC), as well as down-regulation of Notch repressor (FBXW7) are found in pediatric ependymoma. Inhibition of Notch pathway impairs tumor growth in vitro. Notch target ErbB2 is up-regulated in most ependymomas, correlating with poor outcome.

While p53 (TP53) mutations are not often observed in pediatric ependymoma, the p53 pathway is suggested to play a role in radiation therapy resistance and tumor progression, possibly via over-expression of MDM2. Further, up-regulation of p73 (TP73), a homolog of p53, and deletion of the p53 pathway gene p14arf/p16/INK4A (CDKN2A) have also been found in pediatric ependymomas.

Over-expression of components of SHH pathway such as GLI1, GLI2, and STK36 implicates deregulation of the SHH pathway in ependymomas. Moreover, over-expression of SHH targets IGFBP2, IGFBP3, and IGFBP5 in ependymoma is also suggestive of a role for SHH and insulin-like growth factor (IGF) signaling in the pathogenesis of pediatric ependymomas.

=== Rate of progression ===
Endothelial cell KIT expression was associated with a young age at diagnosis of pilocytic astrocytoma or ependymoma. Telomerase activity is found in childhood ependymoma. In addition, telomerase reactivation and maintenance of telomeres appears to be required for progression. Low expression of nucleolin, an interacting protein of telomerase, was found to be the single most important biological predictor of outcome, where low expression correlates with a more favorable prognosis.

== Clinical biology ==
=== Presentation ===
Symptoms present 1–36 months before diagnosis, and can vary depending on age, tumor grade, and location. Increased intracranial pressure can induce vomiting, headache, irritability, lethargy, changes in gait, and in children less than 2, feeding problems, involuntary eye movements, and hydrocephalus are often noticeable. Seizures occur in about 20% of pediatric patients. Loss of cognitive function and even sudden death could occur if the tumor is located at a crucial location for CSF flow. Pediatric ependymomas most often occur in the posterior cranial fossa, in contrast with adult ependymomas which usually occur along the spine. Ependymomas present as low-density masses on CT scans, and are hyperintense on T2-weighted MRI images.

=== Pathology ===
Significant debate remains over grading of ependymomas, though the WHO 2007 classification lists subependymoma (grade I), myxopapillary ependymoma (grade I), ependymoma (grade II), and anaplastic ependymoma (grade III) as the primary classifications. This classification scheme further designates four subtypes within the ependymoma group. However, there are several recognized subtypes of ependymoma with differing pathologies. These include myxopapillary ependymoma (MEPN) which tend to grow slowly and are restricted to the conus medullaris-cauda equina-filum terminale region of the spinal cord, intracranial, infratentorial (posterior fossa), intracranial supratentorial, and spinal ependymoma, and subependymomas. Reports have shown that location-based classification is most relevant to the molecular characteristics, implicating underlying tissue-specificity effects.

Ependymomas arise from oncogenic events mutating normal ependymal cells into cancerous cells. Recent evidence suggests the primary cells are radial glia. Genetic alterations are fairly heterogeneous among histologically similar ependymoma tumors.

=== Diagnostic features ===
Comparative genomic hybridization (CGH) experiments have shown pediatric tumors possess a number of genomic anomalies not seen in adult ependymomas, with a high prevalence of whole chromosome imbalances. Epithelial membrane antigen has been shown to help distinguish ependymomas from other pediatric CNS tumors. Neuraxis MR imaging and lumbar CSF cytology evaluation are widely accepted methods for determining tumor dissemination.

=== Differential diagnoses ===
Once a tumor is suspected, medulloblastomas, diffuse astrocytomas, pilocytic astrocytomas, and ependymomas remain in the differential diagnosis as posterior fossa tumors. However, only pilocytic astrocytomas and ependymomas stain positively for Galectin-3. The subtype of ependymoma can also be narrowed down by molecular means. For instance, the myxopapillary ependyomas have been found to have higher expression of HOXB5, PLA2G5, and ITIH2. A gene expression profiling experiment has shown that three members of the SOX family of transcription factors also possessed discriminatory power between medulloblastomas and ependymomas. Without histology, it is difficult to differentiate grade II versus grade III anaplastic ependymomas because there are no anatomical differences on magnetic resonance imaging.

=== Prognostic features ===
In general, pediatric ependymomas are associated with less favorable prognoses than adult ependymomas, and ependymomas of younger pediatric patients are less favorable than ependymomas of older pediatric patients (reviewed in). Tumors that occur in the posterior fossa have also been shown to have a less favorable prognosis. Expression of TERT in pediatric intracranial ependymomas is correlated with telomerase activity and tumor progression and negatively correlated with survival. The protein nucleolin and expression of MMP2 and MMP14 have been found to inversely correlate with progression free survival in cases of pediatric ependymoma, though RTK-1 family members were not correlated. Tumor microinvasion, even in tumors appearing well-demarcated using various imaging modalities, was also found to be inversely associated with|progression-free and overall survival. Some evidence suggests chromosome 6q25.3 deletion may provide additional survival benefit in pediatric ependymomas.

=== Treatment ===
Chemotherapy regimens for pediatric ependymomas have produced only modest benefit and degree of resection remains the most conspicuous factor in recurrence and survival.

The association of TERT expression with poor outcome in pediatric ependymomas has driven some researchers to suggest that telomerase inhibition may be an effective adjuvant therapy for pediatric ependymomas. Further, data from in vitro experiments using primary tumor isolate cells suggest that inhibition of telomerase activity may inhibit cell proliferation and increase sensitivity of cells to DNA damaging agents, consistent with the observation of high telomerase activity in primary tumors. Additionally, because apurinic/apyrimidinic endonuclease (APE1) has been found to confer radiation resistance in pediatric ependymomas, it has been suggested that inhibitors of Ap endo activity might also restore radiation sensitivity.

Within the infratentorial group of pediatric ependymomas, radiotherapy was found to significantly increase 5-year survival. However, a retrospective review of stereotactic radiosurgery showed it provided only a modest benefit to patients who had previously undergone resection and radiation. Though other supratentorial tumors tend to have a better prognosis, supratentorial anaplastic ependymomas are the most aggressive ependymoma and neither total excision nor postoperative irradiation was found to be effective in preventing early recurrence.

Following resection of infratentorial ependymomas, residual tumor is more likely in lateral versus medial tumors, classified radiologically pre-operatively. Specific techniques, such as cerebellomedullary fissure dissection have been proposed to aid in complete resection while avoiding iatrogenic effects in these cases. Surveillance neuroimaging for recurrence provides additional survival to patients over observation alone.

=== Biochemical markers ===
hTERT and yH2AX are crucial markers for prognosis and response to therapy. High hTERT and low yH2AX expression is associated with poor response to therapy. Patients with both high or low expression of these markers make up the moderate response groups.

=== Relapse ===
The 5-year disease-free survival for age >5 years is 50-60%. Another report found a similar 5-year survival at about 65% with 51% progression-free survival. The 10-year disease-free survival is 40-50%. Younger ages showed lower 5 and 10-year survival rates. A 2006 study that observed 133 patients found 31 (23.3%) had a recurrence of the disease within a five-year period.

=== Long-term consequences of treatment ===
Use of telomerase inhibitors such as Imetelstat seem to have very low toxicity compared to other chemotherapy. The only known side effect of most telomerase inhibitors is dose-induced neutropenia. Neuropsychological deficits can result from resection, chemotherapy, and radiation, as well as endocrinopathies. Additionally, an increase in gastrointestinal complications has been observed in survivors of pediatric cancers.
