= Pacchionian foramen =

Tentorium cerebelli
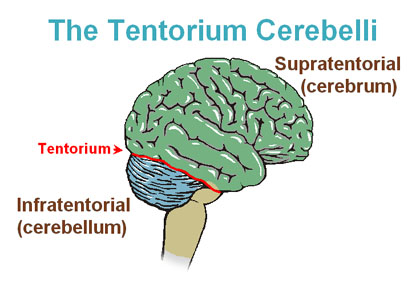

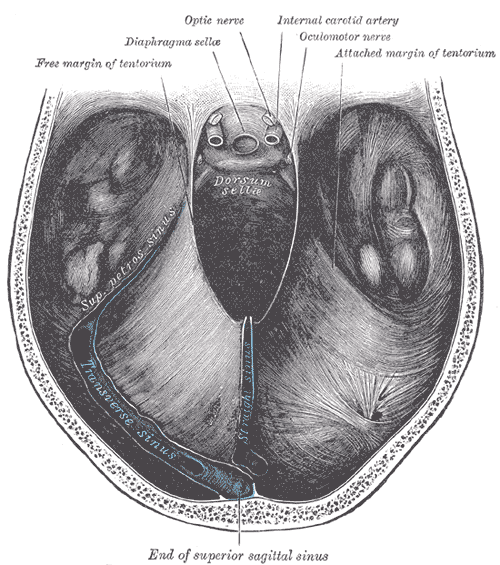
- Tentorium cerebelli seen from above.

Details
- Part of: Meninges

Identifiers
- NeuroNames: 1240

Pacchionian foramen means:

1. incisurae tentorii (aka tentorial notch)
2. a thick opening in the center of the diaphragm of sella through which the infundibulum passes

Due to brain herniation such as supratentorial or infratentorial herniation., the Pacchionian foramen (incisura tentorii) is vital

== Tentorium cerebelli ==
The tentorium cerebelli divides the cranial cavity into two closed spaces which communicate with each other through the incisura tentorii. The larger anterior space includes the anterior and middle cranial fossas and lodges the cerebrum; the small posterior space— the posterior cranial fossa contains the cerebellum, the pons, and the medulla.
