= Duret haemorrhages =

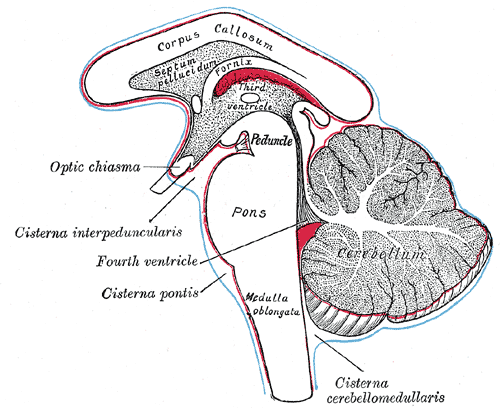
- Brainstem

Duret haemorrhages are small linear areas of bleeding in the midbrain and upper pons of the brainstem. They are caused by a traumatic downward displacement of the brainstem.

They are named after Henri Duret.

== Causes ==
Duret haemorrhages are named after Henri Duret, who discovered these brainstem lesions in dogs with increased intracranial pressure. They are small linear areas of bleeding in the midbrain and upper pons of the brainstem.

They are caused by a traumatic downward displacement of the brainstem with parahippocampal gyrus herniation through the tentorial notch. or acute hematoma, edema following trauma, abscess, or tumor.

== Pathogenesis ==
Duret haemorrhages are haemorrhages secondary to raised intracranial pressure with formation of a transtentorial pressure cone involving the front part of the cerebral peduncles, the cerebral crura. Increased pressure above the tentorium may also involve other midbrain structures.

Kernohan's notch is a groove in the cerebral peduncle which may be caused by this displacement of the brainstem against the tentorial incisure. The resulting ipsilateral hemiparesis is a false localising sign, known as the Kernohan-Woltman syndrome. This may succeed or accompany temporal lobe (uncal) herniation and subfalcian herniation secondary to a supratentorial mass.

The pathophysiological mechanism is uncertain but is probably caused by the displacement of the brainstem stretching and tearing perforating branches of the basilar artery to the pons; venous infarction may play a role.

== Diagnosis ==
Duret haemorrhages can be demonstrated by medical imaging techniques of CT or MRI though difficult.

== Prognosis ==
Duret haemorrhages usually indicate a fatal outcome. However, survival has been reported.

== Society and culture ==
George Gershwin died after emergency surgery of a large brain tumour, believed to have been a glioblastoma. The fact that he had suddenly collapsed and become comatose when he stood up on his last day of life, has been interpreted as brain herniation and Duret haemorrhages.
