= Kernaghan =

Kernaghan is a surname. Other spellings include Kernochan, Kernohan, Kernighan, and Kernahan. Notable people with the surname include:

== Business ==
- James Powell Kernochan (1831–1897), American businessman
  - Catherine Lorillard Kernochan (1835–1917), his wife

== Entertainment ==
- Roxanne Kernohan (1960–1993), Canadian actress
- Paolo Kernahan, Trinidadian television presenter
- Sarah Kernochan (born 1947), American filmmaker

== Law ==
- J. Frederic Kernochan (1842–1929), American attorney
  - Mary Stuart Whitney Kernochan (1849–1922), his wife
- John Marshall Kernochan (1919–2007), American law professor

== Literature ==
- Coulson Kernahan (1858–1943), English novelist
- Eileen Kernaghan (born 1939), Canadian novelist
- Robert Kirkland Kernighan (1854–1926), Canadian poet

== Music ==
- Lee Kernaghan (born 1964), Australian country music singer and songwriter
- Ray Kernaghan, Australian country music artist
- Tania Kernaghan (born 1968), Australian country music singer

== Politics ==
- Charles Kernaghan (1948–2022), American activist
- Liz Kernohan (1939–2004), Australian politician
- Mae Kernaghan (1901–1980), former Republican member of the Pennsylvania House of Representatives
- Patricia Kernighan, American politician
- Terence Kernaghan Canadian politician

== Science ==
- James Watson Kernohan, American pathologist
- Brian Kernighan (born 1942), Canadian computer scientist

== Sport ==
- Alan Kernaghan (born 1967), professional football player and coach
- David Kernahan (born 1965), Australian rules football player
- Hugh Kernohan (born 1958), Scottish fencer
- Mike Kernaghan (born 1955), lawn bowls competitor for New Zealand
- Stephen Kernahan (born 1963), Australian rules football player

== See also ==
- Margaret Kernochan Leech (1893–1974), American historian and fiction writer
- William Kernahan Thomas (1911–2001), American judge
- Kernohan, Edmonton, neighbourhood in Edmonton, Canada
- Kernahan, St. Catharines, neighbourhood in St. Catharines, Canada
- Kernohan's notch, a medical sign
