= Sopor (sleep) =

Condition of abnormally deep sleep or a stupor

Sopor is a medical term for a profound depression of consciousness in which the patient cannot be roused by ordinary stimuli but can still be aroused briefly by strong stimulation such as pain, loud sound, or bright light, while preserving coordinated defensive reactions and vital signs. The term is one of several traditional descriptors used to grade impaired consciousness along a spectrum that ranges from full alertness through coma; its use is most established in German-, Russian-, and Romance-language neurology, whereas in English-language clinical practice the closely related terms obtundation and stupor are more commonly used and the term sopor itself appears less often.

== Etymology ==
The name is derived from Latin sopor ("deep sleep"), cognate with the Latin noun Somnus and the Ancient Greek noun ὕπνος, Hypnos. The same root gives rise to the adjective soporific, meaning "sleep-inducing", used both of drugs (such as sedatives and hypnotics) and of any environmental factor that promotes sleep.

== Clinical features ==
A patient in sopor is unresponsive to spoken commands and ordinary stimulation but can be transiently aroused by vigorous or noxious stimulation, typically by grimacing, withdrawing a limb, or briefly opening the eyes before lapsing back into unresponsiveness. Vital functions (breathing, circulation, body temperature) and brainstem reflexes are largely preserved, distinguishing sopor from coma.

Neurological examination typically reveals decreased muscle tone in the extremities, depressed tendon reflexes, and sluggish but preserved pupillary and corneal reflexes. Paresis and an extensor plantar (Babinski) response may be present depending on the underlying cause. The ability to swallow is generally retained.

== Relationship to other terms for impaired consciousness ==
The English-language clinical literature most often grades depressed alertness along a sequence of alert → confused → somnolent → obtunded → stuporous → comatose, without a separate "sopor" category. In contrast, German neurological and emergency-medicine practice traditionally distinguishes Somnolenz (somnolence), Sopor, and Koma (coma) as three progressively deeper grades of impaired wakefulness, with Stupor sometimes used interchangeably with sopor or inserted between somnolenz and sopor.

The boundaries between these categories are not precisely defined, and a 2012 survey of German emergency physicians by Stahl and Woischneck found wide and overlapping ranges of Glasgow Coma Scale values assigned to sopor, stupor, and somnolence. The same study found that the terms coma and unconsciousness were treated as synonymous by most respondents, but that the intermediate terms produced considerable disagreement. The authors recommended that in trauma medicine these traditional descriptors be supplemented or replaced by numerical Glasgow Coma Scale scores to avoid ambiguity.

== Causes ==
Soporous states arise from any process that disrupts the ascending reticular activating system of the brainstem and diencephalon or that suppresses cortical function bilaterally. Common causes include traumatic brain injury, ischaemic and haemorrhagic stroke, meningitis and other central nervous system infections, intracranial mass lesions, cerebral hypoxia, severe metabolic derangements (such as hypoglycaemia, electrolyte disturbances or uremia), and intoxication with sedative, hypnotic or opioid drugs.

== EEG findings ==
On the electroencephalogram, sopor and other intermediate stages of impaired consciousness are characterised by a diffuse slowing of cortical activity, with reduction of normal alpha activity and an increase in theta and delta activity. Intermittent rhythmic delta activity, particularly over the frontal regions, is commonly seen in sopor and the related states of obtundation and somnolence, and is also associated with deep midline lesions affecting thalamocortical projections.

== See also ==
- Altered level of consciousness
- Coma
- Glasgow Coma Scale
- Obtundation
- Somnolence
- Stupor
