= Mind altering =

Mind altering, mind alteration or altered mind may refer to:

- Psychoactive drug, any chemical substance that changes brain function and results in alterations in perception, mood, or consciousness
- Altered state of consciousness, any condition which is significantly different from a normal waking beta wave state
- Altered level of consciousness, any measure of arousal other than normal
