= Sopor =

Sopor may refer to:

- Sopor (sleep)
- Sopor Aeternus, musical project
- Methaqualone, by the trade name Sopor

== See also ==
- Sopore, a town in Jammu and Kashmir, India
