= James Watson Kernohan =

Irish-American pathologist

James Watson Kernohan, M.D. (1896–1981) was an Irish-American pathologist born October 1, 1896, in County Antrim, Ireland. He studied medicine at Queen's University Belfast, and in 1922 he emigrated to the United States and subsequently worked as a pathologist at the Mayo Clinic in Rochester, Minnesota. Kernohan retired from active medical practice in 1962 and died May 5, 1981.

Kernohan is remembered for his work in neuropathology, particularly research of spinal cord tumors, brain abscesses and metastatic brain lesions. He is credited with developing a widely used classification system for brain tumors. The eponymous Kernohan's notch is named after him, which is a groove in the cerebral peduncle caused by displacement of the brainstem against the incisura of the tentorium cerebelli in some cases of transtentorial herniation.

In 1952 he published an atlas of tumor pathology titled Tumors of the Central Nervous System, and with Mayo neurosurgeon Alfred Uihlein (1908–1990) he published Sarcomas of the Brain.
