= Cushing reflex =

Physiological nervous system response to increased intracranial pressure

Cushing reflex (also referred to as the vasopressor response, the Cushing effect, the Cushing reaction, the Cushing phenomenon, the Cushing response, or Cushing's Law) is a physiological nervous system response to increased intracranial pressure (ICP) that results in Cushing's triad of increased blood pressure, irregular breathing, and bradycardia. It is usually seen in the terminal stages of acute head injury and may indicate imminent brain herniation. It can also be seen after the intravenous administration of epinephrine and similar drugs. It was first described in detail by American neurosurgeon Harvey Cushing in 1901.

== Definition ==
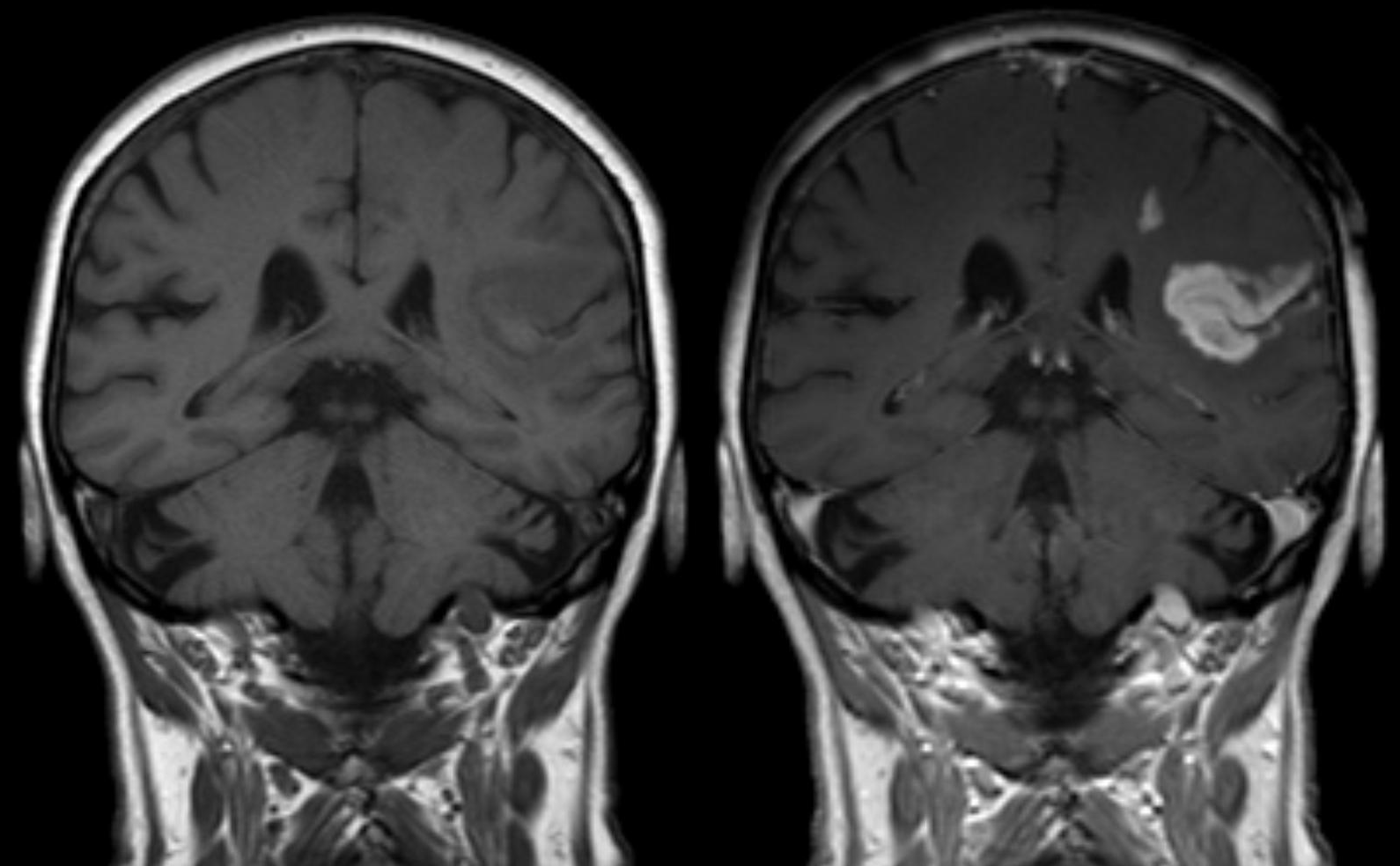
Defect of the blood–brain barrier after stroke shown in T1-weighted MRI images. Left image without, right image with contrast medium administration showing evidence of brain ischemia

The Cushing reflex classically presents as an increase in systolic and pulse pressure, reduction of the heart rate (bradycardia), and irregular respiration. It is caused by increased pressure inside the skull. These symptoms can be indicative of insufficient blood flow to the brain (ischemia) as well as compression of arterioles.

In response to rising intracranial pressure (ICP), respiratory cycles change in regularity and rate. Different patterns indicate a different location of the brain where the injury occurred. The increase in ventilation is exhibited as an increase in rate rather than depth of ventilation, so the Cushing reflex is often associated with slow, irregular breathing. As a result of the now-defective regulation of heart rate and blood pressure, the physiologic response is decreased blood flow peripherally, which can present as Mayer waves. These are simply pathologic waves seen in HR tracings (i.e., arterial lines, electrocardiograph (ECG, etc.), which reflect decreased intravascular blood flow. This decreased flow often causes reflexive vasoconstriction, which leads to an overall increase in blood pressure despite the actual decrease in intravascular volume.

== Differential diagnosis ==
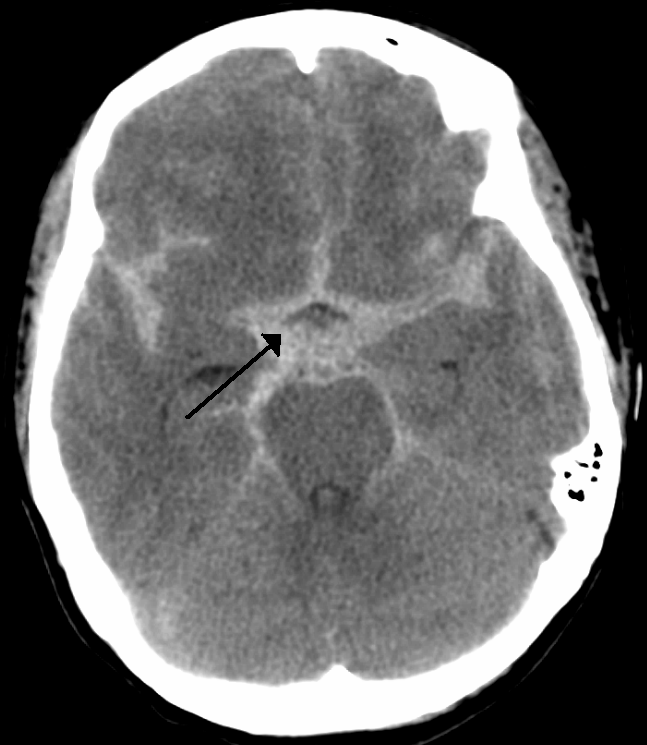
Subarachnoid hemorrhage as shown on a CT scan. It is denoted by the arrow. This type of injury may result in damage to the brainstem, which could initiate or worsen the symptoms of the Cushing reflex

Whenever a Cushing reflex occurs, there is a high probability of death in seconds to minutes. As a result, a Cushing reflex indicates a need for immediate care. Since its presence is a good detector of high ICP, it is often useful in the medical field, particularly during surgery. During any neurosurgery being performed on the brain, there is always a likelihood that raised intracranial pressure may occur. Early recognition of this is crucial to the well-being of the patient. Although direct measurement of ICP is possible, it is not always accurate. In the past, physicians and nurses have relied on hemodynamic changes or bradycardia, which is the slow heart rate in the late phase of the reflex, to identify the ICP increase. Once the initial stage of the Cushing reflex (bradycardia combined with hypertension) was discovered, it offered a much more reliable and swift warning sign of high ICP. It was found that hypertension and bradycardia occurred 93% of the time when cerebral perfusion pressure (CPP) dropped below 15 mmHg due to raised ICP. Also, the Cushing reflex is known to arise only from acute prolonged raises in ICP. Thus, it can be used as a tool by physicians to differentiate acute and chronic rises in ICP.

It has also been reported that the presence of a Cushing reflex due to an ICP increase could allow one to conclude that ischemia has occurred in the posterior cranial fossa. Finally, the Cushing reflex may be one of many ways to identify if a patient has rejected a transplanted organ. Aside from the innate autoimmune response, ischemia in the cranial region has been detected with a transplanted organ that is being rejected. As such, the presence of a Cushing reflex due to ICP can indicate that ischemia may be occurring due to foreign organ rejection.

As first postulated by Harvey Cushing, raised intracranial pressure is the primary cause of the Cushing reflex. Furthermore, continued moderate increases in cranial pressure allows for the Cushing reflex to occur. In contrast, rapid and dramatic pressure rises do not allow for the mechanism of the reflex to sufficiently take place. Elevated intracranial pressure can result from numerous pathways of brain impairment, including: subarachnoid hemorrhages, ischemia, meningitis, trauma, including concussions, hypoxia, tumors, and stroke. In one study, it was confirmed that raised ICP due to subarachnoid hemorrhaging causes mechanical distortion of the brainstem, specifically the medulla. Due to the mechanism of the Cushing reflex, brainstem distortion is then swiftly followed by sympathetic nervous system over activity. In addition, during typical neurosurgical procedures on patients, especially those involving neuroendoscopic techniques, frequent washing of the ventricles have been known to cause high intracranial pressure. The Cushing reflex can also result from low CPP, specifically below 15 mmHg. CPP normally falls between 70-90 mmHg in an adult human, and 60-90 mmHg in children.

Brain plateau wave changes are also associated with the Cushing reflex. These waves are characterized by acute rises of the ICP, and are accompanied by a decrease of the cerebral perfusion pressure. It has been found that if a Cushing reflex occurs, brain plateau wave changes can be erased due to disappearance of high ICP.

== Mechanism ==
The Cushing reflex is complex and seemingly paradoxical. The reflex begins when some event causes increased intracranial pressure (ICP). Since cerebrospinal fluid is located in an area surrounded by the skull, increased ICP consequently increases the pressure in the fluid itself. The pressure in the cerebral spinal fluid eventually rises to the point that it meets and gradually exceeds the mean arterial blood pressure (MAP). When the ICP exceeds the MAP, arterioles located in the brain's cerebrum become compressed. Compression then results in diminished blood supply to the brain, a condition known as cerebral ischemia.

During the increase in ICP, both the sympathetic nervous system and the parasympathetic nervous system are activated. In the first stage of the reflex, sympathetic nervous system stimulation is much greater than parasympathetic stimulation. The sympathetic response activates alpha-1 adrenergic receptors, causing constriction of the body's arteries. This constriction raises the total resistance of blood flow, elevating blood pressure to high levels, which is known as hypertension. The body's induced hypertension is an attempt to restore blood flow to the ischemic brain. The sympathetic stimulation also increases the rate of heart contractions and cardiac output. Increased heart rate is also known as tachycardia. This combined with hypertension is the first stage of the Cushing reflex.

Meanwhile, baroreceptors in the aortic arch detect the increase in blood pressure and trigger a parasympathetic response via the vagus nerve. This induces bradycardia, or slowed heart rate, and signifies the second stage of the reflex. Bradycardia may also be caused by increased ICP due to direct mechanical distortion of the vagus nerve and subsequent parasympathetic response. Furthermore, this reflexive increase in parasympathetic activity is thought to contribute to the formation of Cushing ulcers in the stomach, due to uncontrolled activation of the parietal cells. The blood pressure can be expected to remain higher than the pressure of the raised cerebral spinal fluid to continue to allow blood to flow to the brain. The pressure rises to the point where it overcomes the resisting pressure of the compressed artery, and blood is allowed through, providing oxygen to the hypoxic area of the brain. If the increase in blood pressure is not sufficient to compensate for the compression on the artery, infarction occurs.

Raised ICP, tachycardia, or some other endogenous stimulus can result in distortion and/or increased pressure on the brainstem. Since the brainstem controls involuntary breathing, changes in its homeostasis often results in irregular respiratory pattern and/or apnea. This is the third and final stage of the reflex.

The role of the central chemoreceptors in the Cushing reflex is unclear. In most normal pressure responses the chemoreceptors and baroreceptors work together to increase or decrease blood pressure. In the Cushing reflex, the central chemoreceptors are likely involved in the detection of ischemia, contributing to the sympathetic surge and hypertension in the first phase of the reflex, and work in opposition to the baroreceptors, contributing to the combined high sympathetic and parasympathetic activation.

=== Function ===
Raised intracranial pressure can ultimately result in the shifting or crushing of brain tissue, which is detrimental to the physiological well-being of patients. As a result, the Cushing reflex is a last-ditch effort by the body to maintain homeostasis in the brain. It is widely accepted that the Cushing reflex acts as a baroreflex, or homeostatic mechanism for the maintenance of blood pressure, in the cranial region. Specifically, the reflex mechanism can maintain normal cerebral blood flow and pressure under stressful situations such as ischemia or subarachnoid hemorrhages. A case report of a patient who underwent a spontaneous subarachnoid hemorrhage demonstrated that the Cushing reflex played a part in maintaining cerebral perfusion pressure (CPP) and cerebral blood flow. Eventually, the ICP drops to a level range where a state of induced hypertension in the form of the Cushing reflex is no longer required. The Cushing reflex was then aborted, and CPP was maintained. It has also been shown that an increase in mean arterial pressure due to hypertension, characteristic of the reflex, can cause the normalization of CPP. This effect is protective, especially during increased intracranial pressure, which creates a drop in CPP.

=== Cushing's triad ===
Cushing's triad refers to when all of these symptoms are seen together:

- Irregular, decreased respirations (caused by impaired brainstem function)
- Bradycardia
- Systolic hypertension (with widening pulse pressure)

It is associated with an increase in intracranial pressure.

== History ==
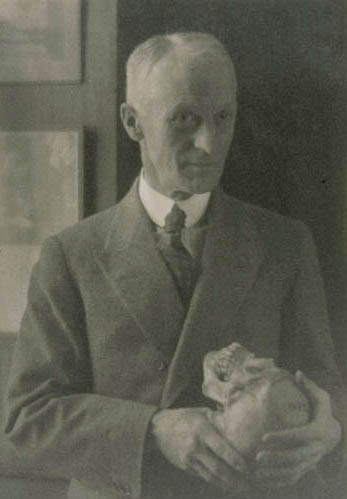
Harvey Cushing, Doris Ulmann 1920s

Cushing's reflex is named after Harvey Williams Cushing (1869–1939), an American neurosurgeon. Cushing began his research in Bern, Switzerland studying abroad with Emil Theodor Kocher. A month into his trip, Cushing received a formal proposition from Emil Theodor Kocher to begin testing how compression of the brain affected blood vessels. Cushing also enlisted the aid of Hugo Kronecker, a known blood pressure researcher. Utilizing Kroenecker's assistance and resources, Cushing began his research. Cushing left Bern in 1901 to work in Turin, Italy with Angelo Mosso, a previous student of Kroenecker. He continued to work on the same research project, while also simultaneously improving his methods of recording coincidence of blood pressure and ICP. In June 1901 Cushing published his first paper through Johns Hopkins Hospital Bulletin entitled "Concerning a definite regulatory mechanism of the vasomotor centre which controls blood pressure during cerebral compression". Between 1901 and 1903, Cushing published five papers pertaining to his research on the vasopressor response. These papers were published in German and English, and one was authored by Emil Theodor Kocher.

=== Experimental setup and results ===
Cushing began experimenting once he obtained approval from Kocher. His experimental setup was a modified version of Leonard Hill's model to similarly test the effects of brain pressure on sinus pressure, cerebrospinal fluid pressure, arterial and venous blood pressure. Like Hill, Cushing used dogs for his experiments. To begin, Cushing monitored the caliber and color of cortical vessels by fitting a glass window into the skull of the dog. Intracranial pressure was raised by filling an intracranial, soft, rubber bag with mercury. Cushing recorded the intracranial pressure along with blood pressure, pulse rate, and respiratory rate simultaneously. This three part effect is commonly referred to as Cushing's triad. In later experiments performed by Mosso, intracranial pressure was induced by injecting physiological saline into the subarachnoid space rather than increasing mercury content of an intracranial bag.

This research clearly displayed the cause and effect relationship between intracranial pressure and cerebral compression. Cushing noted this relationship in his subsequent publications. He also noted that there must exist a specific regulatory mechanism that increased blood pressure to a high enough point such that it did not create anemic conditions. Cushing's publications contain his observations and no statistical analysis. The sample size of the experiment is also not known.

=== Other researchers ===
Several notable figures in the medical field, including Ernst von Bergmann, Henri Duret, Friedrich Jolly, and others experimented with intracranial pressure similarly to Cushing. Some of these researchers published similar findings concerning the relationship of intracranial pressure to arterial blood pressure before Cushing had begun experimenting. Cushing studied this relationship more carefully and offered an improved explanation of the relationship.

Some controversy concerning plagiarism does surround some of Cushing's research. Bernhard Naunyn, a German pathologist and contemporary of Cushing, made remarks claiming that Cushing neither cited him in Cushing's research nor expanded on any of the results that he had found in his original experiments.

== Research directions ==
Although a lot of progress has been made since 1901 when Harvey Cushing first expanded knowledge of what is now known as the Cushing reflex, there are still many aspects of the research that remain to be seen. The exact pathogenesis of the disease remains undetermined. The possibility that intracranial pressure (ICP) may not be the sole cause of the Cushing reflex per se came from an occurrence of Cushing blood pressure response occurring before increased ICP. Some research observed symptoms of Cushing reflex, without the usual increased ICP and medullary anemia, suggesting other causes that still require research. Axial brain stem distortion could be the pathogenesis of Cushing reflex.

The nature of receptors mediating the Cushing response is also unknown. Some research suggests the existence of intracranial baroreceptors to trigger specific Cushing baroreceptor reflex. Experiments by Schmidt and his fellow researchers showed that the Cushing reflex is directed by autonomic nervous system, since its physiological change has to do with the balance of the sympathetic nervous system and parasympathetic nervous system. However, the specific relation between the autonomic nervous system response and the Cushing reflex and its symptoms has yet to be identified.

It has been determined that rate of respiration is affected by the Cushing reflex, though the respiratory changes induced are still an area that needs more research. Some researchers have reported apnea, while others have reported increased respiratory rates. Other researchers have found that increases in respiratory rate follow ICP decreases, while others say it is a response to ICP increase. One must also take into account the use of anesthetics in early experimentation. Research was initially performed on animals or patients under anesthesia. The anesthesia used in experiments have led to respiratory depression, which might have had effect on the results. Early experiments also put animal subjects under artificial ventilation, only allowing for limited conclusions about respiration in the Cushing reflex. The use of anesthetics proposes ideas for future research, since the creation of the Cushing response has been difficult to create under basal conditions or without anesthesia.

Some researchers have also suggested a long-term effect of the Cushing reflex. Thus far it has only been observed as an immediate acute response, but there has been some evidence to suggest that its effects could be prolonged, such as a long-term raise in blood pressure. Heightened sensitivity of neurological response systems leading to arterial hypertension is also possible, but has not been examined.

Although the Cushing reflex was primarily identified as a physiological response when blood flow has almost ceased, its activity has also been seen in fetal life. This activity has not been thoroughly investigated, so there is a need for more research in this area.

The underlying mechanisms of the reflex on a cellular level are yet to be discovered, and will likely be the next area of research if scientists and or doctors chose to do so.

== See also ==
- Bainbridge reflex
- Traumatic brain injury
