= Altered level of consciousness =

Measure of arousal other than normal

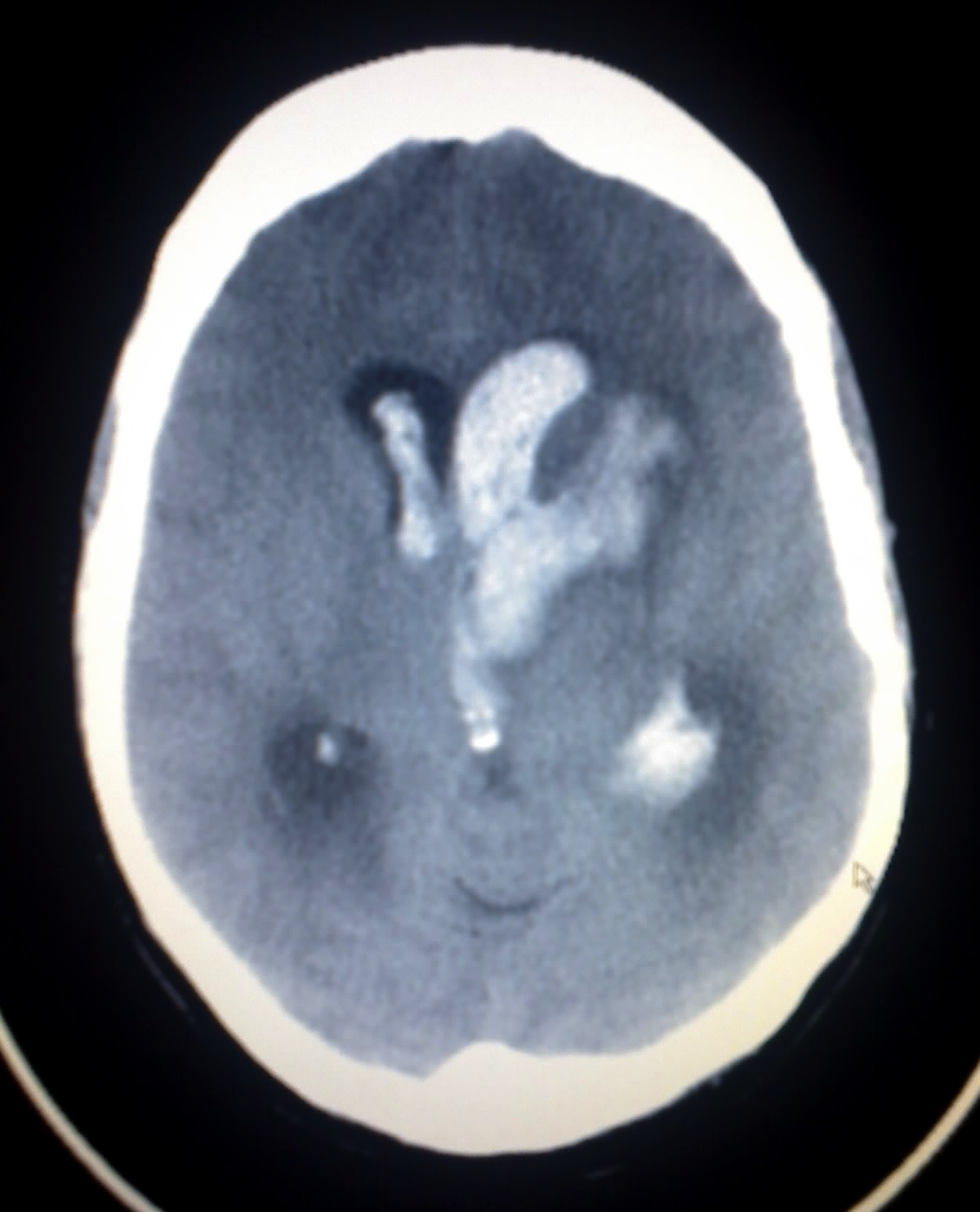
- An intracranial hemorrhage, one cause of altered level of consciousness
- Specialty: Psychiatry, neurology, emergency medicine
- Symptoms: Confusion, disorientation, slurred speech, memory issues
- Complications: Coma
- Causes: Stroke, low blood sugar, poisoning, low sodium in the blood, traumatic brain injury, seizure, alcohol intoxication

An altered level of consciousness is any measure of arousal other than normal. Level of consciousness (LOC) is a measurement of a person's arousability and responsiveness to stimuli from the environment. A mildly depressed level of consciousness or alertness may be classed as lethargy; someone in this state can be aroused with little difficulty. People who are obtunded have a more depressed level of consciousness and cannot be fully aroused. Those who are not able to be aroused from a sleep-like state are said to be stuporous. Coma is the inability to make any purposeful response. Scales such as the Glasgow coma scale have been designed to measure the level of consciousness.

An altered level of consciousness can result from a variety of factors, including alterations in the chemical environment of the brain (e.g. exposure to poisons or intoxicants), insufficient oxygen or blood flow in the brain, and excessive pressure within the skull. Prolonged unconsciousness is understood to be a sign of a medical emergency. A deficit in the level of consciousness suggests that both of the cerebral hemispheres or the reticular activating system have been injured. A decreased level of consciousness correlates to increased morbidity (sickness) and mortality (death). Thus it is a valuable measure of a patient's medical and neurological status. In fact, some sources consider level of consciousness to be one of the vital signs.

== Definition ==
Scales and terms to classify the levels of consciousness differ, but in general, reduction in response to stimuli indicates an altered level of consciousness:

Levels of consciousness
Level	Summary (Kruse)	Description
Metaconscious	Preternatural	People who possess the ability to monitor and control their own cognitive processes in addition to meeting all the criteria indicative of a normal level of consciousness. In the field of cognitive neuroscience, metacognitive monitoring and control have been viewed as functions of the prefrontal cortex, which receives sensory input signals from divergent cortical regions and implements control through feedback loops which are established utilizing the underlying mechanisms of neuroplasticity (Note: See chapters by Schwartz & Bacon and Shimamura, in Dunlosky & Bjork, 2008.)
Conscious	Normal	Assessment of LOC involves checking orientation: people who are able promptly and spontaneously to state their name, location, and the date or time are said to be oriented to self, place, and time, or "oriented X3". A normal sleep stage from which a person is easily awakened is also considered a normal level of consciousness. "Clouding of consciousness" is a term for a mild alteration of consciousness with alterations in attention and wakefulness.
Confused	Disoriented; impaired thinking and responses	People who do not respond quickly with information about their name, location, and the time are considered "obtuse" or "confused". A confused person may be bewildered, disoriented, and have difficulty following instructions. The person may have slow thinking and possible memory time loss. This could be caused by sleep deprivation, malnutrition, allergies, environmental pollution, drugs (prescription and nonprescription), and infection.
Delirious	Disoriented; restlessness, hallucinations, sometimes delusions	Some scales have "delirious" below this level, in which a person may be restless or agitated and exhibit a marked deficit in attention.
Somnolent	Sleepy	A somnolent person shows excessive drowsiness and responds to stimuli only with incoherent mumbles or disorganized movements.
Obtunded	Decreased alertness; slowed psychomotor responses	In obtundation, a person has a decreased interest in their surroundings, slowed responses, and sleepiness.
Stuporous	Sleep-like state (not unconscious); little/no spontaneous activity	People with an even lower level of consciousness, stupor, only respond by grimacing or drawing away from painful stimuli.
Comatose	Cannot be aroused; no response to stimuli	Comatose people do not even make this response to stimuli, have no corneal or gag reflex, and they may have no pupillary response to light.

Altered level of consciousness is sometimes described as altered sensorium.

=== Glasgow Coma Scale ===
The most commonly used tool for measuring LOC objectively is the Glasgow Coma Scale (GCS). It has come into almost universal use for assessing people with brain injury, or an altered level of consciousness. Verbal, motor, and eye-opening responses to stimuli are measured, scored, and added into a final score on a scale of 3–15, with a lower score being a more decreased level of consciousness.

=== Others ===
The AVPU scale is another means of measuring LOC: people are assessed to determine whether they are alert, responsive to verbal stimuli, responsive to painful stimuli, or unresponsive. To determine responsiveness to voice, a caregiver speaks to, or, failing that, yells at the person. Responsiveness to pain is determined with a mild painful stimulus such as a pinch; moaning or withdrawal from the stimulus is considered a response to pain. The ACDU scale, like AVPU, is easier to use than the GCS and produces similarly accurate results. Using ACDU, a patient is assessed for alertness, confusion, drowsiness, and unresponsiveness.

The Grady Coma Scale classes people on a scale of I to V along a scale of confusion, stupor, deep stupor, abnormal posturing, and coma.

== Pathophysiology ==
Although the neural science behind alertness, wakefulness, and arousal are not fully known, the reticular formation is known to play a role in these. The ascending reticular activating system is a postulated group of neural connections that receives sensory input and projects to the cerebral cortex through the midbrain and thalamus from the reticular formation. Since this system is thought to modulate wakefulness and sleep, interference with it, such as injury, illness, or metabolic disturbances, could alter the level of consciousness.

Normally, stupor and coma are produced by interference with the brain stem, such as can be caused by a lesion or indirect effects, such as brain herniation. Mass lesions in the brain stem normally cause coma due to their effects on the reticular formation. Mass lesions that occur above the tentorium cerebelli normally do not significantly alter the level of consciousness unless they are very large or affect both cerebral hemispheres.

== Diagnosis ==
Assessing LOC involves determining an individual's response to external stimuli. Speed and accuracy of responses to questions and reactions to stimuli such as touch and pain are noted. Reflexes, such as the cough and gag reflexes, are also means of judging LOC. Once the level of consciousness is determined, clinicians seek clues for the cause of any alteration. Usually the first tests in the ER are pulse oximetry to determine if there is hypoxia, serum glucose levels to rule out hypoglycemia. A urine drug screen may be sent. A CT head is very important to obtain to rule out bleed. In cases where meningitis is suspected, a lumbar puncture must be performed. A serum TSH is an important test to order. In select groups consider vitamin B12 levels. Checking serum ammonia is particularly advised in neonatal coma to discern inborn errors of metabolism.

=== Differential diagnosis ===
A lowered level of consciousness indicates a deficit in brain function. Level of consciousness can be lowered when the brain receives insufficient oxygen (as occurs in hypoxia), insufficient blood (as occurs in shock — in children for example due to intussusception), or has an alteration in the brain's chemistry. Conditions of the heart and conditions of the lungs can alter consciousness. Metabolic disorders such as diabetes mellitus and uremia can alter consciousness. Hypo- or hypernatremia (decreased and elevated levels of sodium, respectively) as well as dehydration can also produce an altered LOC. A pH outside of the range the brain can tolerate will also alter LOC. Exposure to drugs (e.g. alcohol) or toxins may also lower LOC, as may a core temperature that is too high or too low (hyperthermia or hypothermia). Increases in intracranial pressure (the pressure within the skull) can also cause altered LOC. It can result from traumatic brain injury such as concussion. Ischemic stroke and brain bleeding are other causes of altered consciousness. Infections of the central nervous system may also be associated with decreased LOC; for example, an altered LOC is the most common symptom of encephalitis. Neoplasms within the intracranial cavity can also affect consciousness, as can epilepsy and post-seizure states. A decreased LOC can also result from a combination of factors. A concussion, which is a mild traumatic brain injury (MTBI) may result in decreased LOC.

== Treatment ==
Treatment depends on the degree of decrease in consciousness and its underlying cause. Initial treatment often involves the administration of dextrose if the blood sugar is low as well as the administration of oxygen, naloxone and thiamine.

== See also ==
- Altered state of consciousness
- Disorders of consciousness
- Level of consciousness (esotericism)
- Cognitive deficit
