= Kernohan's notch =

Brain injury symptom

Kernohan's notch is a cerebral peduncle indentation associated with some forms of transtentorial herniation (uncal herniation). It is a secondary condition caused by a primary injury on the opposite hemisphere of the brain. Kernohan's notch is an ipsilateral condition, in that a left-sided primary lesion (in which Kernohan's notch would be on the right side) evokes motor impairment in the left side of the body and a right-sided primary injury evokes motor impairment in the right side of the body. The seriousness of Kernohan's notch varies depending on the primary problem causing it, which may range from benign brain tumors to advanced subdural hematoma.

== Mechanism ==
Kernohan's notch phenomenon is a result of the compression of the cerebral peduncle, which is part of the mesencephalon, against the tentorium cerebelli due to transtentorial herniation. This produces ipsilateral hemiparesis or hemiplegia.

The skull is an incompressible closed space with a limited volume (Monro-Kellie Doctrine). When there is increased cranial pressure in the brain, a shift in the brain forms towards the only opening of the skull, the foramen magnum. Thus, when an increase of pressure in a hemisphere of the brain exists, the cerebral peduncle on the opposite hemisphere is pushed up against the tentorium, which separates the posterior fossa from the middle fossa. This produces a visible "notch" in the cerebral peduncle. Because a Kernohan's notch is caused by an injury creating pressure on the opposite hemisphere of the brain, it is characterized as a false localizing sign.

The Kernohan's notch phenomenon is unique in that it is not only a false localizing sign, but is also ipsilateral or same-sided. The left cerebral peduncle contains motor fibers that cross over to the right side of the body. Thus, if you have a right hemisphere trans-tentorial herniation, it causes a Kernohan's notch in the left cerebral peduncle which results in right-sided motor impairment. Therefore, you get, paradoxically, impairment of motor function on the same side of the body as the herniation which caused the Kernohan's notch on the contralateral side.

== Causes ==
The Kernohan's notch is a secondary phenomenon that results from a major primary injury. Non-tumoral, non-traumatic, intracranial haemorrhage rarely causes this phenomenon.

A wide range of serious injuries can cause an increase in intracranial pressure to trigger the formation of a Kernohan's notch. In general, this phenomenon occurs in patients with advanced brain tumor or severe head injury. In the case of severe head injury, a clot can occur over the surface of the brain and can often cause shift of the middle part of the brain against the tentorium, which creates the Kernohan's notch. Chronic subdural hematomas have been known to be a familiar cause of Kernohan's notch.

MRIs have shown evidence of Kernohan's notch from patients with traumatic head injury that are related to acute space-occupying lesions such as subdural hematoma, epidural hematoma, depressed skull fracture, or spontaneous intracerebral hematoma.

Also, the anatomical size of tentorial notches vary considerably between individuals; however, very little evidence supports that a more narrow notch creates a predisposition towards Kernohan's notch.

== Signs and symptoms ==
Symptoms directly related to the Kernohan's notch is most commonly paralysis or weakness on one side of the body (ipsilateral paralysis / paresis), the so-called Kernohan's sign. Paralysis and weakness is known as hemiplegia and hemiparesis, respectively. This is due to destruction or pressure applied to the motor fibers located in the cerebral peduncle. A more rare sign of Kernohan's notch is ipsilateral oculomotor nerve palsy.

However, most patients come into the clinic citing symptoms associated with the primary injury causing the Kernohan's notch. Since so many types of head injuries exist, virtually any symptom of brain trauma can be seen accompanying Kernohan's notch. These symptoms may range from total paralysis to simple headache, nausea, and vomiting.

== Diagnosis ==
Because of the ipsilateral characteristic of Kernohan's notch, diagnosis is unique. Many clinicians assume a right sided paralysis corresponds with an injury in the left hemisphere of the brain and misdiagnose Kernohan's notch. Despite this complication that ipsilateral paralysis causes, it makes it very easy to diagnose when coupled with imaging techniques. For example, when seeing an MRI of a blood clot on the left side of the brain coupled with left-sided paralysis, it immediately points to Kernohan's notch.

In most head trauma cases, CT scans are the standard diagnostic method; however it is not ideal for imaging small lesions, so MRI is used to identify Kernohan's notch. It is important to distinguish Kernohan's notch from direct brain stem injuries. Case studies have shown that in patients with chronic subdural hematoma, a compressive deformity of the crus cerebri without an abnormal MRI signal may predict a better recovery in patients with Kernohan's notch.

== Treatments ==
There is no special treatment for Kernohan's notch since treatment is completely dependent on the injury causing it. The pressure against the tentorium should be relieved and the notch should go away. However, this does not mean that damage to the motor fibers disappears. Depending on the severity of the injury, there may or may not be persistent damage after pressure relief. Neurological deficits may resolve after surgery, but some degree of deficit, especially motor weakness, generally remains.

Pressure relief to "un-notch" the cerebral peduncle may include the removal of brain tumors and blood clots or the suction of blood from a drilled hole in the skull.

== Case studies ==
=== Kernohan's notch and misdiagnosis ===
The ipsilateral and false localizing signs characteristic of Kernohan's notch sometimes cause confusion and result in misdiagnosis. Such a case is described in an account by Wolf at the University Hospital in Groningen, Netherlands:

"A 39 year-old man sustained a minor head injury when he was struck on the head by a golf club. 5 hours later, he had sudden onset of headache with nausea and vomiting, Simultaneously he developed muscle weakness on his left side. He then became somnolent. A CT scan showed a subdural blood collection on the left side...these findings puzzled the attending neurologist as well as the radiologist who both expected the abnormalities to be on the opposite (right) side. The radiological technician remarked that the left-right marks were not in the usual place on the monitor screen and argued that the latest scan had been a coronal infundibulum scan in which a top-view is used instead of a bottom view...It was then decided that the patient had a right-sided acute subdural haematoma. In the operating room a right-sided drilling hole was made but no blood was aspirated, nor was it from a second right-sided drilling hole. A right-sided craniotomy was then done, which did not show any signs of a subdural blood collection and the operation was ended...a postoperative CT scan the next day showed a subdural haematoma on the left side and the signs of craniotomy on the right...Reconstruction of the events led to the conclusions that the false localizing signs were caused by a Kernohan notch...the left-right marks on the screen had initially been correct but were wrongly switched to fit the patients' clinical symptoms. This sad, but unique, example of misdiagnosis has prompted us to re-evaluate the index settings before examination of each new patient."

=== Ruptured occipital arteriovenous malformation ===
Kernohan's notch phenomenon associated with a ruptured arteriovenous malformation (AVM) is rare, but not unknown. This was accounted for in a case study described by Fujimoto at the Tsukuba Memorial Hospital in Ibaraki, Japan:

"The patient, a 23 year-old woman, visited our outpatient clinic with a chief complaint of severe headache, nausea and vomiting. Her pupils did not react to light and her left pupil was mydriasic...The patient was immediately operated on to decompress the brain and remove the subdural hematoma. The onset-operation interval was 46 min...Intraoperatively, a parenchymal AVM was found in the occipital area, which was removed. On day four part onset, we noticed left hemiparesis with a partial left oculomotor nerve palsy, the so called Kernohan's phenomenon...One month after onset, the patient had no significant neurological deficit...We believe that her good outcome with little neurological deficit was due to the short interval from onset to the first operation."

Another case-report involving AVM:

"Right AVM produced a Kernohan's notch phenomenon in a 33 year-old male who was admitted to the Inland Empire Medical Center with full seizures and a GCS of 6. CT evaluation revealed a subdural hematoma that was evacuated with an emergency craniotomy about 45 minutes after initial onset. Patient experienced transient right-sided paralysis of limbs that resolved after 48 hours. The volume of blood flow across the dura created when the AVM burst caused compression of the brainstem on the level of the tentorium on the opposite side. Subsequently, the patient was transferred to Cedars-Sinai under the surgical care of Wouter Schievink, MD and has made a complete recovery after one-year."

== History ==
=== Early findings ===
One of the first references to casual brain herniation was that of James Colier, who clearly described cerebellar tonsilar herniation in 1904. He observed accompanying false localizing signs and commented:

"In many cases of intracranial tumour of long duration, it was found postmortem that the posterior inferior part of the cerebellum had been pushed down and backwards into the foramen magnum and the medulla itself somewhat caudally displaced, the two structures together forming a cone-shaped plug tightly filling up the foramen magnum."

In 1920, Adolf Meyer confirmed the pathologies of brain herniation. He commented:

"The falx and tentorium constitute an important protection against any sudden impacts of pressure by keeping apart heavy portions of the brain, but they also provide an opportunity for trouble in case of swelling or need of displacement."

The work of Collier and Meyer described ipsilateral hemiparesis, a false localizing sign. However, it became known as the Kernohan-Woltman phenomenon.

=== Kernohan-Woltman ===
In 1929, Kernohan and Woltman published their work on brain lesions that showed ipsilateral hemiplegia. In their paper, they state:

"The tumour was often large enough to displace the brain toward the opposite side and also to cause herniation through the tentorium. Such herniation and displacement may be evidenced by a groove sweeping over the uncinate gyrus on the side of the tumour. On the opposite side the groove may be absent...".(p. 282)

Kernohan fully described the Kernohan's notch in 1929 and is given credit for its discovery.

== See also ==
- Intracranial pressure
- Traumatic brain injury
- Duret haemorrhage

This is an interesting story in that Kernohan and Woltman's article never did support their own contention that the ipsilateral finding they reported were due to the notching from the displacement of the hemisphere containing the tumor (as follows): As seen in their Fig. 7, There were a total of 35 supratentorial cases all of them with midbrain notching opposite the hemisphere bearing the lesion. However, only 17 of these 35 had "false" localizing signs (ipsilateral to the tumor; hyperactive reflexes, upgoing toes, etc.).The rest did not have such signs. Therefore, logically speaking, there were no cause and effect relationship between notching and the "herniation" signs (again, since exactly half of those with the notches were "asymptomatic." The reason for occurrence of these signs in half of the population affected must have been the laterality of the hemisphere harboring the tumor, not the presence or absence of a notch resulting from the tumor (which was a fact present in all cases). We now know that influences of the hemisphere of speech (i.e. the command center, major hemisphere) on the other hemisphere (the minor) is excitatory and via the corpus callosum. Therefore, only those cases with tumors in the major hemisphere suffered deafferentation of the contralateral (minor) hemisphere; rendering it nonfunctional, causing appearance of signs on the same side as the tumor. Those with tumors in the nondominant hemisphere (minor) did not have ipsilateral signs as there is no motor communication from the minor to the major hemisphere to cause deafferentation of the major hemisphere (diaschisis) (see www.mimickingman.com, for details).

== Notes ==
Carrasco et al., 2017; Zhang et al. 2017 review
