= Obtundation =

Mild-to-moderate reduction in conscious awareness

- Specialty: Emergency medicine

Obtundation is mild to moderate alertness reduction (altered level of consciousness) with decreased interest in the environment and slower than normal reactivity to stimulation. It is distinguished from the much stronger states of unresponsiveness of stupor and coma. Obtundation typically occurs as a result of a medical condition or trauma.

There exist a wide range of potential causes, including head injury, interruption of blood circulation, impaired oxygenation or carbon dioxide toxicity (hypercapnia), central nervous system (CNS) infections, drug intoxication or withdrawal, post-seizure state, hypothermia, and metabolic derangements such as hypoglycemia, hyponatremia, and hypercalcaemic crisis.

Symptoms include delayed reaction time, lessened interest in the environment, very short attention span, and excessive sleeping.

The root word, obtund, means "dulled or less sharp" (cf. obtuse angle).

== See also ==
- Altered level of consciousness
