= Tentorial notch =

Brain structure in humans and some mammals

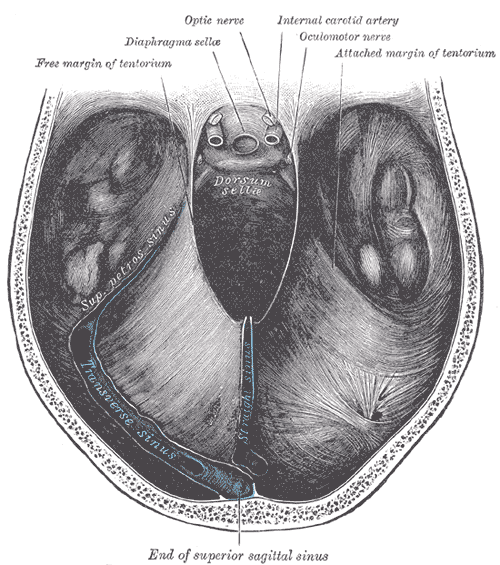
- Tentorial notch seen from above. An easy description is simply the opening created by the cerebellar tentorium

Details
- Part of: Tentorium cerebelli

Identifiers
- Latin: incisura tentorii
- TA98: A14.1.01.105
- TA2: 5376
- FMA: 306052

The tentorial notch (also known as the tentorial incisure or incisura tentorii) refers to the anterior opening between the free edge of the cerebellar tentorium and the clivus for the passage of the brainstem.

The midbrain continues with the thalamus of the diencephalon through the tentorial notch.

== Structure ==
The tentorial notch is located between the tentorial edges and communicates the supratentorial and infratentorial spaces. This area can be divided into three spaces: anterior, middle (lateral to), and posterior to the brainstem. The middle incisural space is close to the midbrain and the upper pons at the level of the pontomesencephalic sulcus. Medial temporal lobe structures such as the uncus, the parahippocampal gyrus and the hippocampal formation, are also intimately related to the incisura. The principal vascular structures coursing along the middle incisural space are the posterior cerebral artery and the superior cerebellar artery which pass around the brainstem, parallel to the free tentorial edge. The incisura has also a close relationship with the first 6 cranial nerves.

== Clinical significance ==
If intracranial pressure superior to the cerebellar tentorium is increased, it may force part of the temporal lobe through this notch. This is referred to as a tentorial brain herniation. The consequences are unconsciousness, widening of the pupil of the affected side, and hemiparesis on the opposite side.
