= ZIC1 =

Protein-coding gene in the species Homo sapiens

Identifiers
- Aliases: ZIC1, ZIC, ZNF201, CRS6, Zic family member 1, BAIDCS
- External IDs: OMIM: 600470; MGI: 106683; GeneCards: ZIC1

Gene location (Human)
Chr.	Chromosome 3 (human)
Band	3q24	Start	147,393,422 bp
Band	3q24	End	147,510,293 bp

Gene location (Mouse)
Chr.	Chromosome 9 (mouse)
Band	9 E3.2|9 48.26 cM	Start	91,240,111 bp
Band	9 E3.2|9 48.26 cM	End	91,247,863 bp
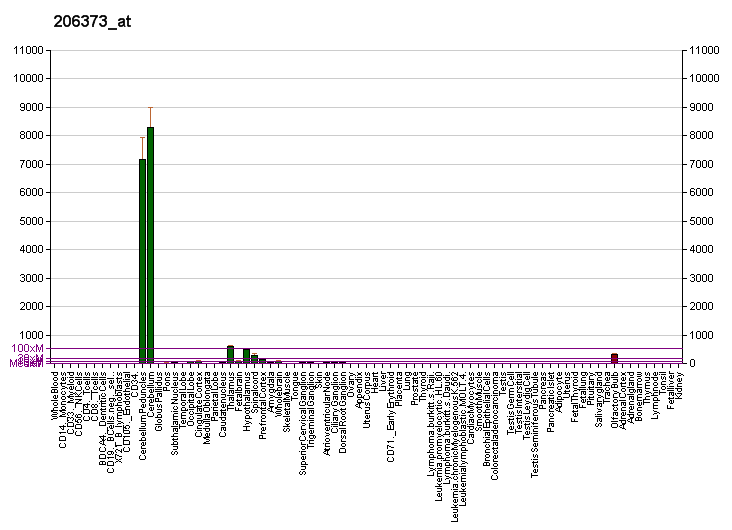
RNA expression pattern
Bgee	Human / Mouse (ortholog); Top expressed in: paraflocculus of cerebellum; optic nerve; right hemisphere of cerebellum; pons; Epithelium of choroid plexus; endothelial cell; lateral nuclear group of thalamus; dorsal motor nucleus of vagus nerve; trigeminal ganglion; cerebellar vermis / Top expressed in: habenula; cerebellar vermis; lobe of cerebellum; lateral septal nucleus; ciliary body; lateral geniculate nucleus; medial geniculate nucleus; iris; medial dorsal nucleus; pineal gland; More reference expression data
BioGPS	More reference expression data
Gene ontology
Molecular function	DNA binding; DNA-binding transcription factor activity; DNA-binding transcription activator activity, RNA polymerase II-specific; metal ion binding; RNA polymerase II cis-regulatory region sequence-specific DNA binding; nucleic acid binding; RNA polymerase II transcription regulatory region sequence-specific DNA binding; DNA-binding transcription factor activity, RNA polymerase II-specific
Cellular component	cytoplasm; nucleus
Biological process	pattern specification process; cell differentiation; regulation of transcription, DNA-templated; transcription by RNA polymerase II; transcription, DNA-templated; nervous system development; positive regulation of transcription, DNA-templated; multicellular organism development; regulation of smoothened signaling pathway; central nervous system development; brain development; inner ear morphogenesis; spinal cord development; positive regulation of protein import into nucleus; positive regulation of transcription by RNA polymerase II; adult walking behavior
Sources:Amigo / QuickGO
Orthologs
Databases	NCBI: entry; OMA: entry
Species	Human	Mouse
Entrez	7545	22771
Ensembl	ENSG00000152977	ENSMUSG00000032368
UniProt	Q15915	P46684
RefSeq (mRNA)	NM_003412	NM_009573; NM_001376941
RefSeq (protein)	NP_003403	NP_033599; NP_001363870
Location (UCSC)	Chr 3: 147.39 – 147.51 Mb	Chr 9: 91.24 – 91.25 Mb
PubMed search
- Wikidata
View/Edit Human	View/Edit Mouse

ZIC1 is a member of the Zinc finger of the cerebellum (ZIC) protein family.

ZIC1 is classified as a ZIC protein due to conservation of the five C2H2 zinc fingers, which enables the protein to interact with DNA and proteins. ZIC1 is found in close genomic configuration in another member of this protein family, ZIC4. Correct function of these proteins is critical for early development, and as such mutations of the genes encoding these proteins is known to result in various congenital defects. For example, if function of both ZIC1 and ZIC4 is lost (which can occur via an interstitial deletion due to their adjacent location) then this may result in the Dandy–Walker malformation.

== Interactions ==
ZIC1 has been shown to interact with GLI1 and GLI3.
