= GLI1 =

Protein-coding gene in humans

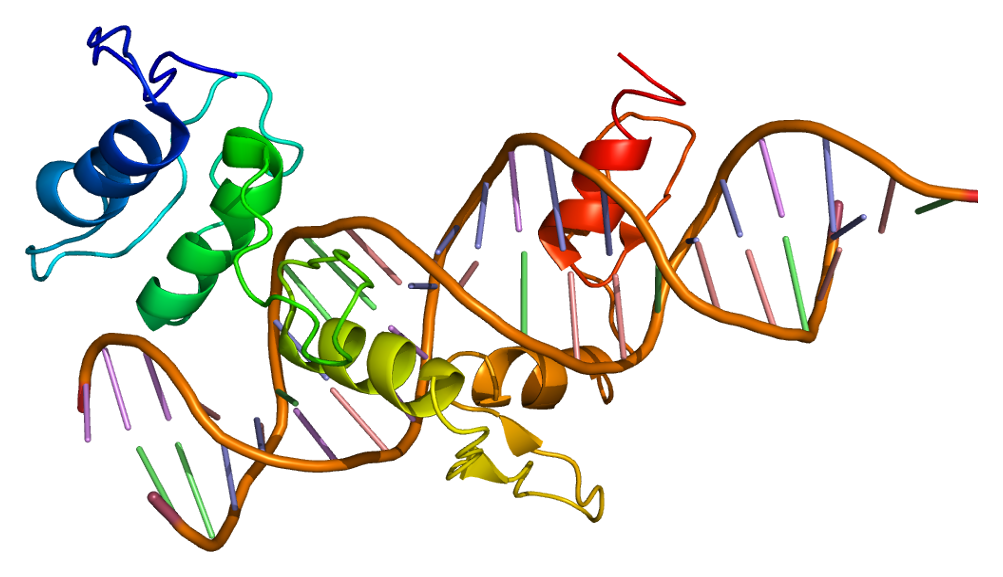

Identifiers
- Aliases: GLI1, GLI, GLI family zinc finger 1, PAPA8, PPD1
- External IDs: OMIM: 165220; MGI: 95727; GeneCards: GLI1
Available structures
PDB	Ortholog search: PDBe RCSB
PDB	List of PDB id codes 2GLI, 4BLB, 4KMD

Gene location (Human)
Chr.	Chromosome 12 (human)
Band	12q13.3	Start	57,459,785 bp
Band	12q13.3	End	57,472,268 bp

Gene location (Mouse)
Chr.	Chromosome 10 (mouse)
Band	10 D3|10 74.5 cM	Start	127,165,751 bp
Band	10 D3|10 74.5 cM	End	127,177,843 bp
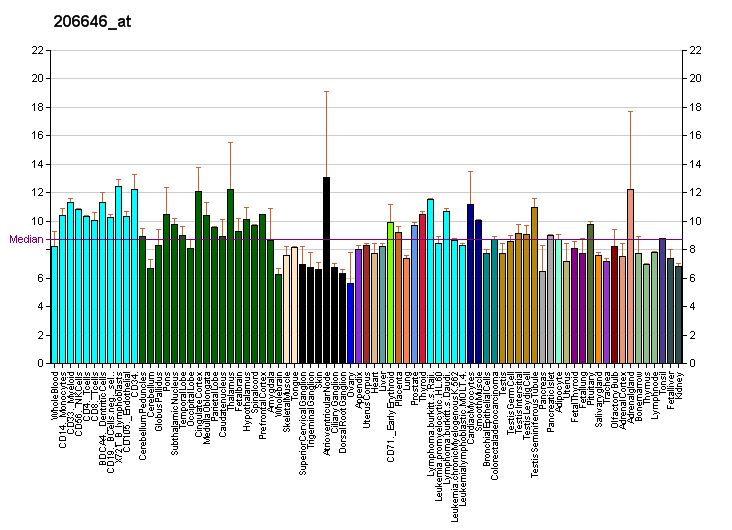
RNA expression pattern
Bgee	Human / Mouse (ortholog); Top expressed in: tibial nerve; sural nerve; gastric mucosa; canal of the cervix; testicle; dorsal motor nucleus of vagus nerve; rectum; blood; gonad; stromal cell of endometrium / Top expressed in: spermatogonium; tooth; molar; Gonadal ridge; lip; genital tubercle; dermis; palate; epithelium of seminiferous tubule of testis; lower jaw; More reference expression data
BioGPS	More reference expression data
Gene ontology
Molecular function	DNA binding; sequence-specific DNA binding; RNA polymerase II transcription regulatory region sequence-specific DNA binding; microtubule binding; chromatin binding; metal ion binding; RNA polymerase II cis-regulatory region sequence-specific DNA binding; protein binding; nucleic acid binding; transcription factor activity, RNA polymerase II distal enhancer sequence-specific binding; DNA-binding transcription factor activity, RNA polymerase II-specific
Cellular component	cytoplasm; cytosol; cilium; nucleoplasm; ciliary base; ciliary tip; axoneme; nucleus
Biological process	epidermal cell differentiation; proximal/distal pattern formation; cell differentiation; pituitary gland development; regulation of transcription, DNA-templated; positive regulation of smoothened signaling pathway; lung development; positive regulation of cell migration; smoothened signaling pathway involved in regulation of cerebellar granule cell precursor cell proliferation; notochord regression; transcription, DNA-templated; positive regulation of transcription, DNA-templated; positive regulation of DNA replication; ventral midline development; multicellular organism development; regulation of smoothened signaling pathway; liver regeneration; response to wounding; regulation of osteoblast differentiation; osteoblast differentiation; spermatogenesis; positive regulation of cell population proliferation; cerebellar cortex morphogenesis; regulation of hepatocyte proliferation; canonical Wnt signaling pathway; smoothened signaling pathway; dorsal/ventral pattern formation; negative regulation of canonical Wnt signaling pathway; positive regulation of transcription by RNA polymerase II; digestive tract morphogenesis; prostate gland development; positive regulation of cardiac muscle cell proliferation; positive regulation of cell cycle G1/S phase transition
Sources:Amigo / QuickGO
Orthologs
Databases	NCBI: entry; OMA: entry
Species	Human	Mouse
Entrez	2735	14632
Ensembl	ENSG00000111087	ENSMUSG00000025407
UniProt	P08151	P47806
RefSeq (mRNA)	NM_001160045; NM_001167609; NM_005269	NM_010296
RefSeq (protein)	NP_001153517; NP_001161081; NP_005260	NP_034426
Location (UCSC)	Chr 12: 57.46 – 57.47 Mb	Chr 10: 127.17 – 127.18 Mb
PubMed search
- Wikidata
View/Edit Human	View/Edit Mouse

Zinc finger protein GLI1 also known as glioma-associated oncogene is a protein that in humans is encoded by the GLI1 gene. It was originally isolated from human glioblastoma cells.

== Function ==
The Gli proteins are the effectors of Hedgehog (Hh) signaling and have been shown to be involved in cell fate determination, proliferation and patterning in many cell types and most organs during embryo development. In the developing spinal cord the target genes of Gli proteins, that are themselves transcription factors, are arranged into a complex gene regulatory network that translates the extracellular concentration gradient of Sonic hedgehog into different cell fates along the dorsoventral axis.

The Gli transcription factors activate/inhibit transcription by binding to Gli responsive genes and by interacting with the transcription complex. The Gli transcription factors have DNA binding zinc finger domains which bind to consensus sequences on their target genes to initiate or suppress transcription. Yoon showed that mutating the Gli zinc finger domain inhibited the proteins effect proving its role as a transcription factor. Gli proteins have an 18-amino acid region highly similar to the α-helical herpes simplex viral protein 16 activation domain. This domain contains a consensus recognition element for the human TFIID TATA box-binding protein associated factor TAFII31. Other proteins such as Missing in Metastasis (MIM/BEG4) have been shown to potentiate the effects of the Gli transcription factors on target gene transcription. Gli and MIM have been shown to act synergistically to induce epidermal growth and MIM + Gli1 overexpressing grafts show similar growth patterns to Shh grafts.

== Gli family ==
There are three members of the family; Gli1, Gli2 and Gli3 which are all transcription factors mediating the Hh pathway. The GLI1, GLI2, and GLI3 genes encode transcription factors which all contain conserved tandem C2-H2 zinc finger domains and a consensus histidine/cysteine linker sequence between zinc fingers. This Gli motif is related to those of Kruppel which is a Drosophila segmentation gene of the gap class. In transgenic mice, mutant Gli1 lacking the zinc fingers does not induce Sonic Hedgehog (Shh) targets. The conserved stretch of 9 amino acids connects the C-terminal histidine of one finger to the N-terminal cysteine of the next. The GLI consensus finger amino acid sequence is [Y/F]JXCX3GCX3[F/Y]X5LX2HX4H[T/S]GEKP. The Gli1 and Gli2 protein zinc finger DNA binding domain have been shown to bind to the DNA consensus GLI binding site GACCACCCA.

Gli Proteins transcriptional regulation is tissue specific for many targets. For example, Gli1 in primary keratinocytes upregulates FOXM1 whereas in mesenchymal C3H10T1/2 cells it has been shown to upregulate platelet-derived growth factor receptor PDGFRa.

Human Gli1 encodes a transcription activator involved in development that is a known oncogene. It has been found that N-terminal regions of Gli1 recruit histone deacetylase complexes via SuFu, which are involved in DNA folding in chromosomes. This may negatively regulate transcription indicating Gli1 could act as transcriptional inhibitor as well as an activator. The human GLI1 promoter region is regulated by a 1.4 kb 5' region including a 5' flanking sequence, an untranslated exon and 425bp of the first intron. Numerous proteins such as Sp1, USF1, USF2, and Twist are also involved in Gli1 promoter regulation. During mouse embryo development Gli1 expression can be detected in the gut mesoderm, ventral neural tube, ependymal layer of the spinal cord, forebrain, midbrain, cerebellum, and in sites of endochondral bone formation. Some of the downstream gene targets of human Gli1 include regulators of the cell cycle and apoptosis such as cyclin D2 and plakoglobin respectively. Gli1 also upregulates FoxM1 in BCC. Gli1 expression can also mimic Shh expression in certain cell types.

== Isolation ==
GLI1 was originally isolated from a glioma tumour and has been found to be up regulated in many tumors including muscle, brain and skin tumors such as Basal cell carcinoma (BCC). DNA copy-number alterations that contribute to increased conversion of the oncogenes Gli1–3 into transcriptional activators by the Hedgehog signaling pathway are included in a genome-wide pattern, which was found to be correlated with an astrocytoma patient's outcome. Shh and the Gli genes are normally expressed in hair follicles, and skin tumours expressing Gli1 may arise from hair follicles. The level of Gli1 expression correlates with the tumor grade in bone and soft tissue sarcomas. Transgenic mice and frogs overexpressing Gli1 develop BCC like tumours as well as other hair follicle-derived neoplasias, such as trichoepitheliomas, cylindromas, and trichoblastomas. Expression of Gli1 in the embryonic frog epidermis results in the development of tumours that express endogenous Gli1. This suggests that overexpressed Gli1 alone is probably sufficient for tumour development Mutations leading to the expression of Gli1 in basal cells are thus predicted to induce BCC formation.

== Interactions ==
GLI1 has been shown to interact with:

- SAP18,
- STK36,
- SUFU, and
- ZIC1.
