= STK36 =

Protein-coding gene in the species Homo sapiens

Identifiers
- Aliases: STK36, FU, serine/threonine kinase 36, CILD46
- External IDs: OMIM: 607652; MGI: 1920831; GeneCards: STK36
Enzyme activity
EC #	BRENDA	ExPASy	KEGG	MetaCyc
2.7.11.1	↗	↗	↗	↗

Gene location (Human)
Chr.	Chromosome 2 (human)
Band	2q35	Start	218,672,069 bp
Band	2q35	End	218,702,716 bp

Gene location (Mouse)
Chr.	Chromosome 1 (mouse)
Band	1|1 C4	Start	74,640,604 bp
Band	1|1 C4	End	74,676,053 bp
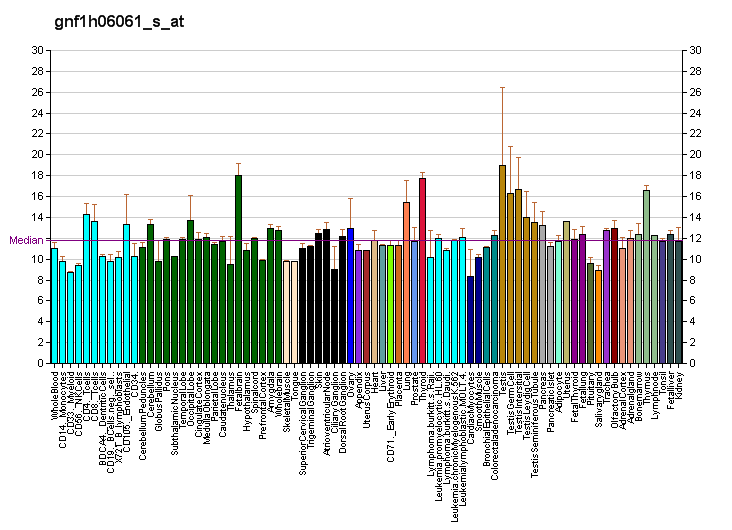

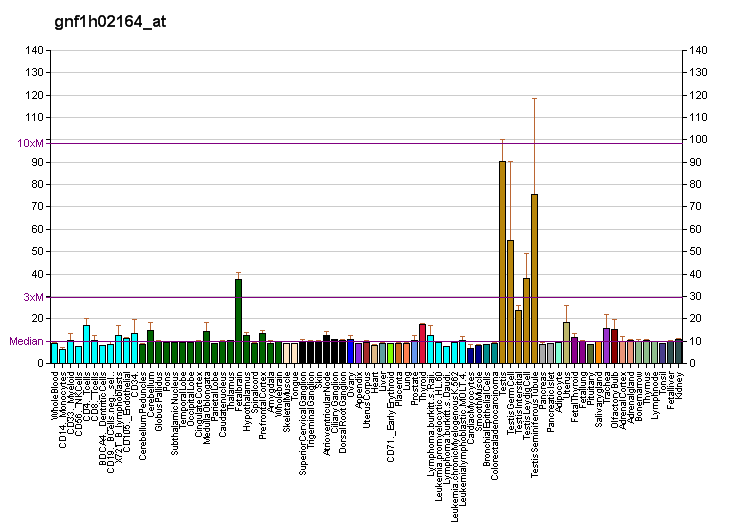
RNA expression pattern
Bgee	Human / Mouse (ortholog); Top expressed in: right uterine tube; anterior pituitary; left testis; right testis; right lobe of thyroid gland; right ovary; right adrenal cortex; left ovary; left lobe of thyroid gland; body of uterus / Top expressed in: gastrula; zygote; secondary oocyte; primary oocyte; spermatid; seminiferous tubule; Meckel's cartilage; occiput; occipital bone; humerus; More reference expression data
BioGPS	More reference expression data
Gene ontology
Molecular function	nucleotide binding; protein binding; protein kinase activity; kinase activity; transferase activity; transcription factor binding; metal ion binding; protein serine/threonine kinase activity; ATP binding
Cellular component	nucleus; cytoplasm; cytosol; extracellular region
Biological process	phosphorylation; cell projection organization; regulation of DNA-binding transcription factor activity; multicellular organism development; epithelial cilium movement involved in extracellular fluid movement; brain development; positive regulation of smoothened signaling pathway; positive regulation of hh target transcription factor activity; protein phosphorylation; post-embryonic development; cilium assembly
Sources:Amigo / QuickGO
Orthologs
Databases	NCBI: entry; OMA: entry
Species	Human	Mouse
Entrez	27148	269209
Ensembl	ENSG00000163482	ENSMUSG00000033276
UniProt	Q9NRP7	Q69ZM6
RefSeq (mRNA)	NM_001243313; NM_015690; NM_001369423	NM_175031
RefSeq (protein)	NP_001230242; NP_056505; NP_001356352	NP_778196; NP_001391006; NP_001391007
Location (UCSC)	Chr 2: 218.67 – 218.7 Mb	Chr 1: 74.64 – 74.68 Mb
PubMed search
- Wikidata
View/Edit Human	View/Edit Mouse

Serine/threonine-protein kinase 36 is an enzyme that in humans is encoded by the STK36 gene.

== Interactions ==
STK36 has been shown to interact with GLI1.
