= Henri Duret =

French neurologist (1849–1921)

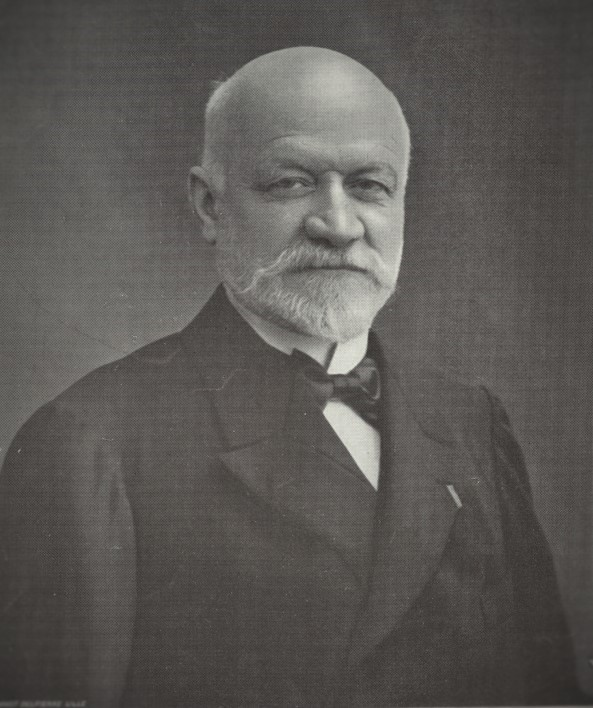
Henri Duret

Henri Duret (7 July 1849, Condé-sur-Noireau – 7 April 1921) was a French neurologist whose contributions to the knowledge of cerebral circulation and the physiology of the brainstem were important for the early years of brain surgery. For thirty years he was associated with "Faculté Libre de Médecine" in Lille, France, and became dean of the school. He also organized and directed Red Cross hospitals during World War I.

Among his publications was a monograph on intracranial tumors titled Les tumeurs de l’encéphale (1905), and a major work on craniocerebral injuries titled Traumatismes cranio-cérébraux (1921). Other noted writings by Duret are:

- Etudes expérimentales et cliniques sur les traumatismes cérébreaux, (1878) Delahaye, Paris.
- "The role of the dura mater and its nerves in cerebral traumatism", (1878) in Brain 1:29–47.

== Eponyms ==
Duret hemorrhage – small brainstem hemorrhage due to rupture of the paramedian basilar artery branches resulting from brainstem distortion secondary to transtentorial herniation.

Duret lesion – small hemorrhage(s) in the floor of the fourth ventricle or beneath the aqueduct of Sylvius.
