= Stupor =

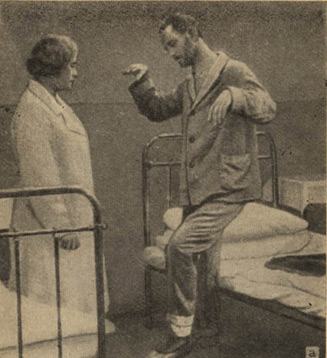
- A patient in catatonic stupor
- Specialty: Neurology, Psychiatry

Stupor is the lack of critical mental function and level of consciousness, in which an affected person is almost entirely unresponsive and responds only to intense stimuli such as pain. The word derives from the Latin stupor ("numbness, insensibility").

== Signs and symptoms ==
Stupor is characterized by impaired reaction to external stimuli. Those in a stuporous state are rigid, mute and only appear to be conscious, as the eyes are open and follow surrounding objects. If not stimulated externally, a patient with stupor will appear to be in a sleepy state most of the time. In some extreme cases of severe depressive disorders the patient can become motionless, lose their appetite and become mute. Short periods of restricted responsivity can be achieved by intense stimulation (e.g. pain, bright light, loud noise, shock).

== Causes ==
Stupor is associated with infectious diseases, complicated toxic states (e.g. heavy metals), severe hypothermia, mental illnesses (e.g. schizophrenia, major depressive disorder), epilepsy, vascular illnesses (e.g. hypertensive encephalopathy), acute stress reaction (shock), neoplasms (e.g. brain tumors), brain disorders (e.g. alzheimers, dementia, fatal insomnia), B_{12} deficiency, major trauma, alcohol poisoning, vitamin D excess, and other conditions.

Lesions of the ascending reticular activation system on height of the pons and metencephalon have been shown to cause stupor. The incidence is higher after left-sided lesions.

== Management ==
Because stupors are caused by another health condition, treatment focuses on uncovering and treating the cause. Doctors may administer IV antibiotics or fluids to treat infections and nutritional deficits, or conduct an MRI to check for lesions on the brain.

== See also ==
- Torpor
