= Brain herniation =

Potentially deadly side effect of very high pressure within the skull

Cerebral herniation
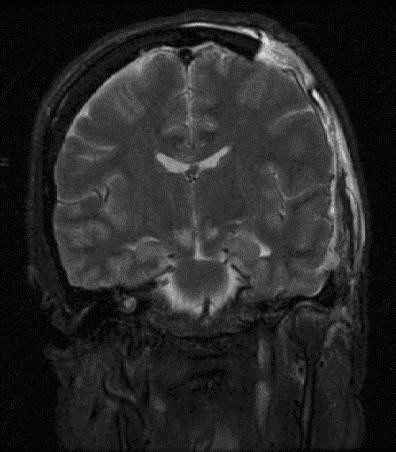
- MRI showing injury due to brain herniation
- Specialty: Neurology, neurosurgery

Brain herniation is a potentially deadly side effect of very high pressure within the skull that occurs when a part of the brain is squeezed across structures within the skull. The brain can shift across such structures as the falx cerebri, the tentorium cerebelli, and even through the foramen magnum (the hole in the base of the skull through which the spinal cord connects with the brain). Herniation can be caused by a number of factors that cause a mass effect and increase intracranial pressure (ICP): these include traumatic brain injury, intracranial hemorrhage, or brain tumor.

Herniation can also occur in the absence of high ICP when mass lesions such as hematomas occur at the borders of brain compartments. In such cases local pressure is increased at the place where the herniation occurs, but this pressure is not transmitted to the rest of the brain, and therefore does not register as an increase in ICP.

Because herniation puts extreme pressure on parts of the brain and thereby cuts off the blood supply to various parts of the brain, it is often fatal. Therefore, extreme measures are taken in hospital settings to prevent the condition by reducing intracranial pressure, or decompressing (draining) a hematoma which is putting local pressure on a part of the brain.

== Signs and symptoms ==
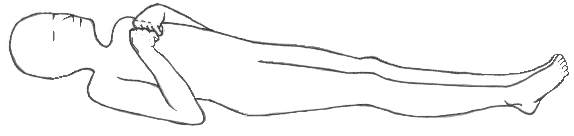
Decorticate posturing, with elbows, wrists and fingers flexed, and legs extended and rotated inward

Brain herniation frequently presents with abnormal posturing, a characteristic positioning of the limbs indicative of severe brain damage. These patients have a lowered level of consciousness, with Glasgow Coma Scores of three to five. Coma and persistent vegetative state also occur. One or both pupils may be dilated and fail to constrict in response to light. Vomiting can also occur due to compression of the vomiting center in the medulla oblongata. Severe headaches and seizures as a result of increased intracranial pressure are not uncommon. Cardiovascular and pulmonary symptoms may also be present as the brain loses function, but might also be associated with bleeding. These symptoms are known as Cushing's Triad: hypertension (with widening pulse pressure), irregular respirations (commonly Cheyne-Stokes), bradycardia and in severe cases cardiac arrest.

== Causes ==
Causes of brain herniation include:

- Brain edema
- Hematoma
- Stroke
- Tumour
- Infection

== Classification ==
Types of brain herniation.

The tentorium is an extension of the dura mater that separates the cerebellum from the cerebrum. There are two major classes of herniation: supratentorial and infratentorial. Supratentorial refers to herniation of structures normally found above the tentorial notch, and infratentorial refers to structures normally found below it.

- Supratentorial herniation

1) Uncal (transtentorial)

2) Central

3) Cingulate (subfalcine or transfalcine)

4) Transcalvarial

5) Tectal (posterior)

- Infratentorial herniation

6) Upward (upward cerebellar or upward transtentorial)

7) Tonsillar (downward cerebellar)

=== Uncal herniation ===
In uncal herniation, a common subtype of transtentorial herniation, the innermost part of the temporal lobe, the uncus, can be squeezed so much that it moves towards the tentorium and puts pressure on the brainstem, most notably the midbrain. The tentorium is a structure within the skull formed by the dura mater of the meninges. Tissue may be stripped from the cerebral cortex in a process called decortication.

The uncus can squeeze the oculomotor nerve (a.k.a. CN III), which may affect the parasympathetic input to the eye on the side of the affected nerve, causing the pupil of the affected eye to dilate and fail to constrict in response to light as it should. Pupillary dilation often precedes the somatic motor effects of CN III compression called oculomotor nerve palsy or third nerve palsy. This palsy presents as deviation of the eye to a "down and out" position due to loss of innervation to all ocular motility muscles except for the lateral rectus (innervated by abducens nerve (a.k.a. CN VI) and the superior oblique (innervated by trochlear nerve a.k.a. CN IV). The symptoms occur in this order because the parasympathetic fibers surround the motor fibers of CN III and are hence compressed first.

Compression of the ipsilateral posterior cerebral artery will result in ischemia of the ipsilateral primary visual cortex and contralateral visual field deficits in both eyes (contralateral homonymous hemianopsia).

Another important finding is a false localizing sign, the so-called Kernohan's notch, which results from compression of the contralateral cerebral crus containing descending corticospinal and some corticobulbar tract fibers. This leads to Ipsilateral hemiparesis in reference to the herniation and contralateral hemiparesis with reference to the cerebral crus.

With increasing pressure and progression of the hernia there will be distortion of the brainstem leading to Duret hemorrhages (tearing of small vessels in the parenchyma) in the median and paramedian zones of the mesencephalon and pons. The rupture of these vessels leads to linear or flamed shaped hemorrhages. The disrupted brainstem can lead to decorticate posture, respiratory center depression and death. Other possibilities resulting from brain stem distortion include lethargy, slow heart rate, and pupil dilation.

Uncal herniation may advance to central herniation. The sliding uncus syndrome represents uncal herniation without alteration in the level of consciousness and other sequelae mentioned above.

=== Central herniation ===
In central herniation, the diencephalon and parts of the temporal lobes of both of the cerebral hemispheres are squeezed through a notch in the tentorium cerebelli. Transtentorial herniation can occur when the brain moves either up or down across the tentorium, called ascending and descending transtentorial herniation respectively; however descending herniation is much more common. Downward herniation can stretch branches of the basilar artery (pontine arteries), causing them to tear and bleed, known as a Duret hemorrhage. The result is usually fatal. Other symptoms of this type of herniation include small, fixed pupils with paralysis of upward eye movement giving the characteristic appearance of "sunset eyes". Also found in these patients, often as a terminal complication is the development of diabetes insipidus due to the compression of the pituitary stalk. Radiographically, downward herniation is characterized by obliteration of the suprasellar cistern from temporal lobe herniation into the tentorial hiatus with associated compression on the cerebral peduncles. Upwards herniation, on the other hand, can be radiographically characterized by obliteration of the quadrigeminal cistern. Intracranial hypotension syndrome has been known to mimic downwards transtentorial herniation.

=== Cingulate herniation ===
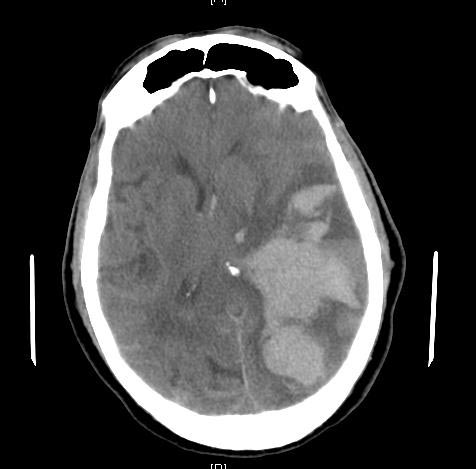
Subfalcine herniation on CT

In cingulate or subfalcine herniation, the most common type, the innermost part of the frontal lobe is scraped under part of the falx cerebri, the dura mater at the top of the head between the two hemispheres of the brain. Cingulate herniation can be caused when one hemisphere swells and pushes the cingulate gyrus by the falx cerebri. This does not put as much pressure on the brainstem as the other types of herniation, but it may interfere with blood vessels in the frontal lobes that are close to the site of injury (anterior cerebral artery), or it may progress to central herniation. Interference with the blood supply can cause dangerous increases in ICP that can lead to more dangerous forms of herniation. Symptoms for cingulate herniation are not well defined. Usually occurring in addition to uncal herniation, cingulate herniation may present with abnormal posturing and coma. Cingulate herniation is frequently believed to be a precursor to other types of herniation.

=== Transcalvarial herniation ===
In transcalvarial herniation, the brain squeezes through a fracture or a surgical site in the skull. Also called "external herniation", this type of herniation may occur during craniectomy, surgery in which a flap of skull is removed, the protruding brain region preventing the piece of skull from being replaced during the operation.

=== Upward herniation ===
Increased pressure in the posterior fossa can cause the cerebellum to move up through the tentorial opening in upward, or cerebellar herniation. The midbrain is pushed through the tentorial notch upward. This is also known as ascending transtentorial herniation since it occurs across the tentorium cerebelli.

=== Tonsillar herniation ===
In tonsillar herniation, also called downward cerebellar herniation, transforaminal herniation, or "coning", the cerebellar tonsils move downward through the foramen magnum possibly causing compression of the lower brainstem and upper cervical spinal cord as they pass through the foramen magnum. Increased pressure on the brainstem can result in dysfunction of the centers in the brain responsible for controlling respiratory and cardiac function. The most common signs are intractable headache, head tilt, and neck stiffness due to tonsillar impaction. The level of consciousness may decrease and also give rise to flaccid paralysis. Blood pressure instability is also evident in these patients.

Congenital tonsillar herniation of the cerebellum is also known as a Chiari malformation (CM), or previously an Arnold-Chiari malformation (ACM). There are four types of Chiari malformation, and they represent very different disease processes with different symptoms and prognosis. These conditions can be found in asymptomatic patients as an incidental finding, or can be so severe as to be life-threatening. This condition is now being diagnosed more frequently by radiologists, as more patients undergo MRI scans of their heads, especially upright MRI, which is more than twice as sensitive for detecting this condition. Cerebellar tonsillar ectopia (CTE) is a term used by radiologists to describe cerebellar tonsils that are "low lying" but that do not meet the radiographic criteria for definition as a Chiari malformation. The currently accepted radiographic definition for a Chiari malformation is that cerebellar tonsils lie at least 5mm below the level of the foramen magnum. Some clinicians have reported that some patients appear to experience symptoms consistent with a Chiari malformation without radiographic evidence of tonsillar herniation. Sometimes these patients are described as having a 'Chiari [type] 0'.

There are many suspected causes of tonsillar herniation including: decreased or malformed posterior fossa (the lower, back part of the skull) not providing enough room for the cerebellum; hydrocephalus or abnormal CSF volume pushing the tonsils out; or dural tension pulling the brain caudally. Connective tissue disorders, such as Ehlers Danlos syndrome, can be associated.

For further evaluation of tonsillar herniation, CINE flow studies are used. This type of MRI examines flow of CSF at the cranio-cervical joint. For persons experiencing symptoms but without clear MRI evidence, especially if the symptoms are better in the supine position and worse upon standing/upright, an upright MRI may be useful.

== Treatment ==
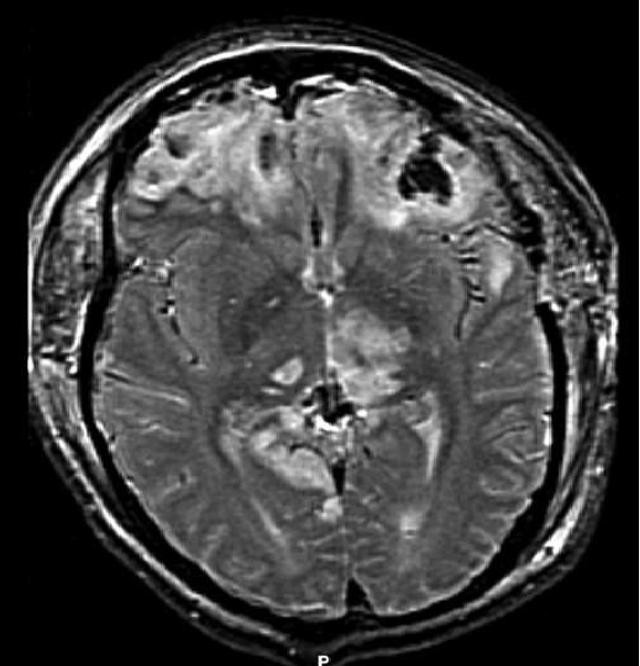
MRI showing damage due to herniation. This patient was left with residual disabilities including those involving movement and speech.

Treatment involves removal of the etiologic mass and decompressive craniectomy. Brain herniation can cause severe disability or death. In fact, when herniation is visible on a CT scan, the prognosis for a meaningful recovery of neurological function is poor. The patient may become paralyzed on the same side as the lesion causing the pressure, or damage to parts of the brain caused by herniation may cause paralysis on the side opposite the lesion. Damage to the midbrain, which contains the reticular activating network which regulates consciousness, will result in coma. Damage to the cardio-respiratory centers in the medulla oblongata will cause respiratory arrest and (secondarily) cardiac arrest. Investigation is underway regarding the use of neuroprotective agents during the prolonged post-traumatic period of brain hypersensitivity associated with the syndrome.

== See also ==
- Second-impact syndrome
