= Infratentorial region =

Brain region

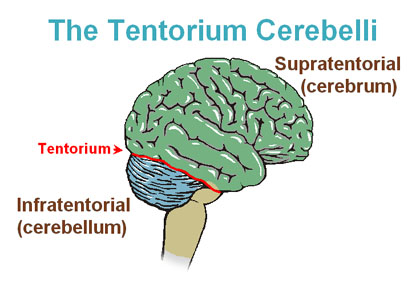
Infratentorial region

In anatomy, the infratentorial region of the brain is the area located below the tentorium cerebelli. The area of the brain above the tentorium cerebelli is the supratentorial region. The infratentorial region contains the cerebellum, while the supratentorial region contains the cerebrum. The infratentorial dura is innervated by nerves from C1-C3.
