= Supratentorial region =

Area of the brain

Cerebellar tentorium
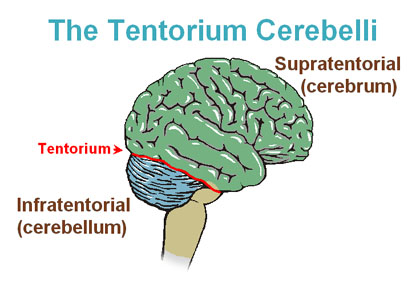

Details

Identifiers
- Latin: Tentorium cerebelli

In anatomy, the supratentorial region of the brain is the area located above the tentorium cerebelli. The area of the brain below the tentorium cerebelli is the infratentorial region. The supratentorial region contains the cerebrum, while the infratentorial region contains the cerebellum.

Although the Roman era anatomist Galen commented upon it, the functional significance of this neuroanatomical division was first described using ‘modern’ terminology by John Hughlings Jackson, founding editor of the medical journal Brain.

From extensive studies of anatomy and behaviour, Hughlings Jackson established the existence of a clear division of cognitive functionality located at or around the tentorium cerebelli. In his proposed scheme, while the supratentorial parts (mainly the cerebrum) were responsible for planning and control of movement in the world, the infratentorial parts (mainly the cerebellum) were responsible for planning and control of bodily motion per se.

Most primary tumors of the central nervous system are located supratentorial.
