= Cerebellar tentorium =

Vertebrate brain structure separating the cerebellum from the occipital lobes

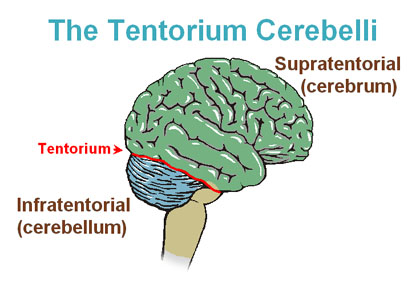

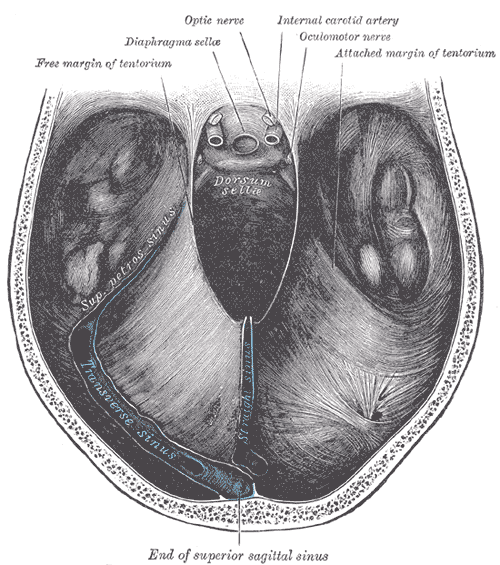
- Cerebellar tentorium seen from above.

Details
- Part of: Meninges

Identifiers
- Latin: tentorium cerebelli
- NeuroNames: 1240
- TA98: A14.1.01.104
- TA2: 5375
- FMA: 83966

The cerebellar tentorium or tentorium cerebelli (Latin for "tent of the cerebellum") is one of four dural folds that separate the cranial cavity into four (incomplete) compartments. The cerebellar tentorium separates the cerebellum from the cerebrum forming a supratentorial and an infratentorial region; the cerebrum is supratentorial and the cerebellum infratentorial.

The free border of the tentorium gives passage to the midbrain (the upper-most part of the brainstem).

== Structure ==
=== Free border ===
The free border of the tentorium is U-shaped; it forms an aperture - the tentorial notch (tentorial incisure) - which gives passage to the midbrain. The free border of each side extends anteriorly beyond the medial end of the superior petrosal sinus (i.e. the apex of the petrous part of the temporal bone) to overlap the attached margin, thenceforth forming a ridge of dura mater upon the roof of the cavernous sinus, terminating anteriorly by attaching at the anterior clinoid process.

The tentorium slopes superior-ward so that the free border is situated at a more superior level than its bony attachment, thus conforming to the shape of the surfaces of the cerebrum and cerebellum with which it is in contact.

=== Attached border ===
The attached margin of the tentorium cerebelli is attached at the edges of the transverse sinuses and superior petrosal sinus (here, the two layers of the tentorium diverge to embrace the sinuses); it thus attaches onto the occipital bone posteriorly, and (the superior angle of) the petrous part of the temporal bone anteriorly.

Anteriorly, its attachment extends to the posterior clinoid processes; posteriorly, it extends to the internal occipital protuberance.

It is attached, behind, by its convex border, to the transverse ridges upon the inner surface of the occipital bone, and there encloses the transverse sinuses; in front, to the superior angle of the petrous part of the temporal bone on either side, enclosing the superior petrosal sinuses.

=== Relations ===
The posterior end of the falx cerebri attaches onto the midline of the upper surface of the tentorium; the straight sinus runs along this line of junction.

== Clinical significance ==
Brain tumors are often characterized as supratentorial (above the tentorium) and infratentorial (below the tentorium). The location of the tumor can help in determining the type of tumor, as different tumors occur with different frequencies at each location. Additionally, most childhood primary brain tumors are infratentorial, while most adult primary brain tumors are supratentorial. The location of the tumor may have prognostic significance as well.

Since the tentorium is a hard structure, if there is an expansion of the volume of the brain or its surrounding matter above the tentorium, such as because of a tumour or bleeding, the brain can get pushed down partly through the tentorium. This is called herniation and will often cause an enlarged pupil on the affected side, due to pressure on the oculomotor nerve. Tentorial herniation is a serious symptom, especially since the brainstem is likely to be compressed as well if the intracranial pressure rises further. A common type of herniation is uncal herniation.

Calcifications within the cerebellar tentorium are not very common in elderly people; they are not accompanied by any disease and have no known cause.

== Additional images ==
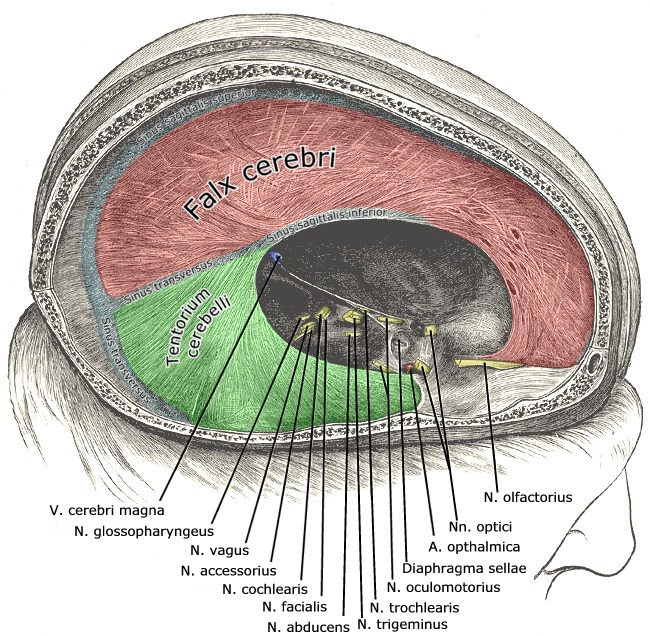
Dura mater and its processes exposed by removing part of the right half of the skull, and the brain.

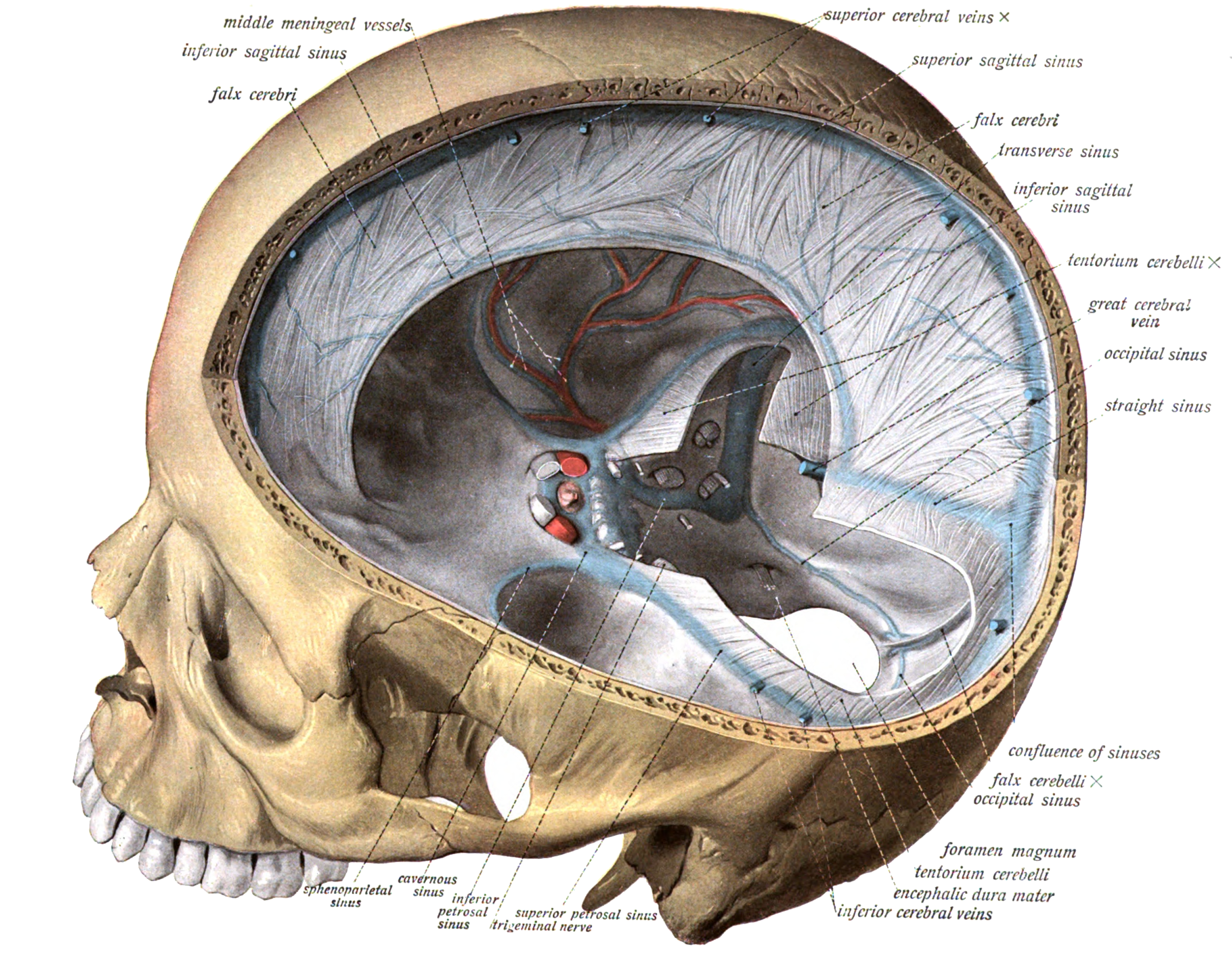
Tentorium cerebelli seen cut out in the back of the skull.

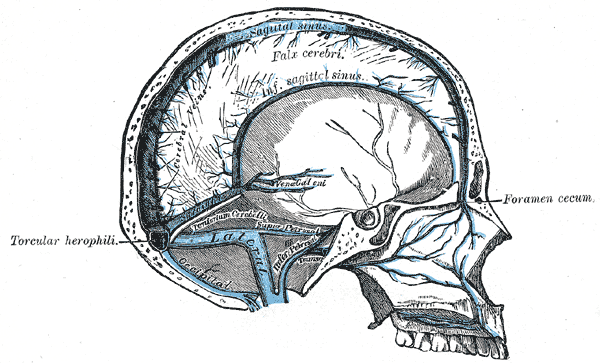
Sagittal section of the skull, showing the sinuses of the dura.

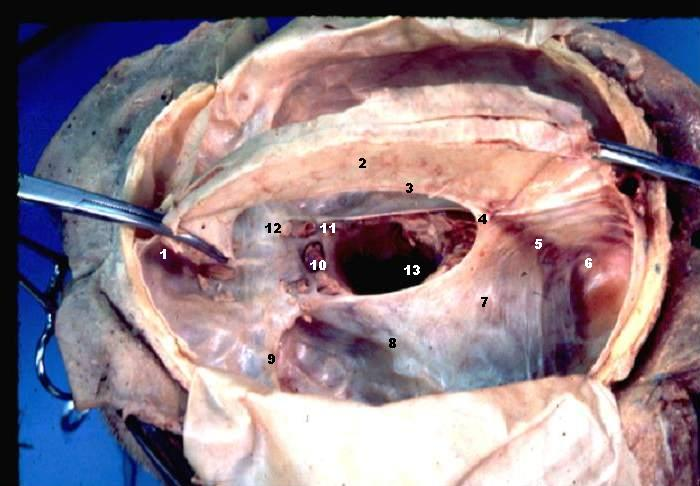
Human brain dura mater (reflections)

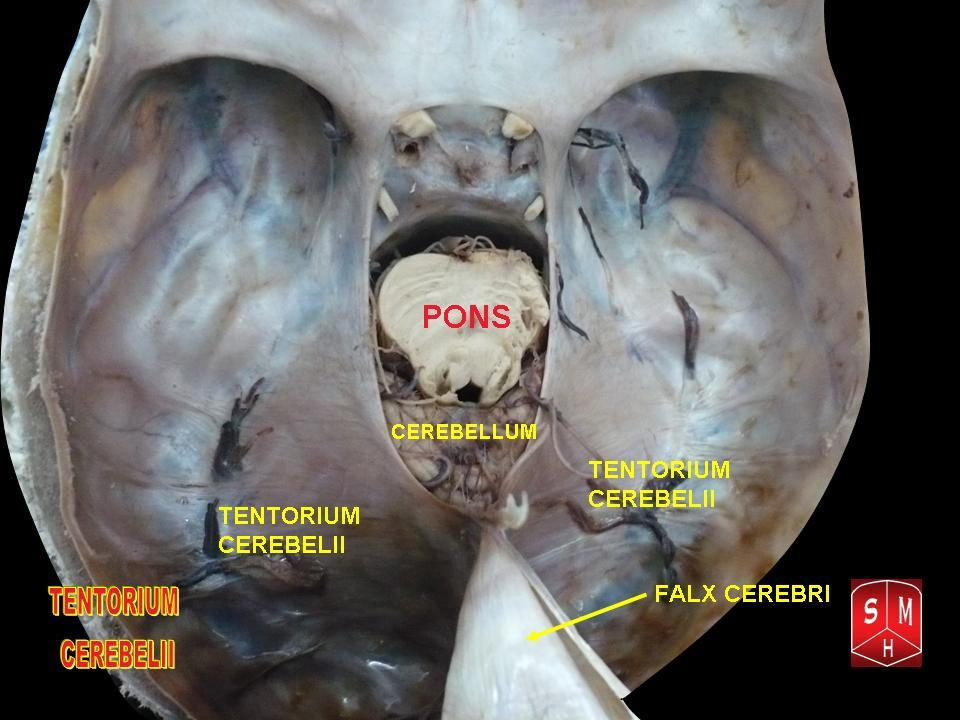
Tentorium cerebelli
