= List of people who awoke from a coma =

This is a list of people who awoke from coma-like states, such as a persistent vegetative state, minimally conscious state, catatonic stupor, or locked-in syndrome after a lengthy period of time.

Name	Birth and death years	Coma start	Duration	Coma end	Nationality	Details
Munira Abdulla	1959	1991	27 years	2018	Emirati	Coma caused by a car crash.
Riaan Bolton	1980–2019	2003, July	3 years	2006	South African	Suffered severe brain trauma in a car crash. Emerged when his family learned about the effect of the drug Zolpidem on fellow coma victim Louis Viljoen (see below).
Gary Dockery	1954–1997	1988	>7.5 years	1996	American	Police officer who went into a coma after being shot in the forehead. Unlike most patients who come out of a coma after years, after two days of talking, he became unresponsive again.
Jan Grzebski	1942–2008	1988	4 years	1992	Polish	Railroad worker.
Donald Herbert	1961–2006	29 December 1995	>9 years	30 April 2005	American	Firefighter. Lapsed into a coma after a burning building collapsed on him, starving his brain of oxygen. He awoke more than nine years later and was able to speak to his friends and family before returning to a minimally responsive state. Died from pneumonia on 21 February 2006, aged 44.
Leonard Lowe	1920s–?	1939	>30 years	1969	American	Fell into a catatonic stupor resulting from encephalitis lethargica. In 1969, Dr. Oliver Sacks managed to awaken him and a few other Spanish flu-related catatonic patients using a medication called levodopa or L-dopa. After a brief period of being in a fully recovered state, Lowe and all of the other patients fell back into their catatonic stupors with occasional very short periods of reawakenings. Lowe's and the other patients' stories were the focus of the 1973 book Awakenings and the 1990 movie adaptation Awakenings.
Wanda Palmer	~1970/71–2024	2020, June	2 Years	2022, July	American	Beaten up and left for dead in a June 2020 attack. In July 2022, she awoke and identified her brother Daniel Palmer as the attacker. Daniel Palmer was arrested and died days later in custody.
Martin Pistorius	1975		3 years vegetative; 4 years minimally conscious; 5 years able to move only eyes	1999	South African	In 1999, he fully awoke. He recovered to the point that he was able to become a web designer, developer, and author. In 2011, he wrote a book called Ghost Boy, in which he describes his many years of being comatose.
Annie Shapiro	1913–2003	1963	29 years	1992	Canadian	Annie Shapiro (1913–2003) was a Canadian apron shop owner who was in a coma for 29 years because of a massive stroke and suddenly awoke in 1992. After the patients in the true story Awakenings, Shapiro spent the longest time in a coma-like state before waking up. Her story inspired the 1998 movie Forever Love.
Louis Viljoen	~1970	1994			South African	Louis Viljoen (born c. 1970). In 1994, this South African switchboard operator fell into a persistent vegetative state after being hit by a truck while riding his bike. In 1999, Dr. Wally Nel gave him Zolpidem (also known as Ambien) after a nurse told Viljoen's mother that involuntary spasms in his left arm had caused him to tear his mattress and that this could have been because of him feeling uncomfortable deep inside. Within 25 minutes, he was talking, and by November 2006 he had recovered to the point where it is no longer necessary to give him Zolpidem. The drug has since been used to awaken other coma patients, and several have been awakened around the world since, such as Riaan Bolton (see above).
Terry Wallis	1964–2022	1984	~1 year coma 19 years in a minimally conscious state		American	Coma caused by truck crash.

== See also ==
- Coma
- Karolina Olsson (1861–1950), a Swedish woman who allegedly hibernated for 32 years
