= 1988–89 in English football =

Football in England
- Season: 1988–89

Men's football
- First Division: Arsenal
- Second Division: Chelsea
- Third Division: Wolverhampton Wanderers
- Fourth Division: Rotherham United
- Conference: Maidstone United
- FA Cup: Liverpool
- Associate Members' Cup: Bolton Wanderers
- League Cup: Nottingham Forest
- Charity Shield: Liverpool

The 1988–89 season was the 109th season of competitive football in England.

The season saw Arsenal win their first league title for 18 years, in dramatic fashion, as they beat defending champions Liverpool 2–0 at Anfield to clinch the title on number of goals scored. Liverpool had won the FA Cup six days earlier, and (for the second consecutive season) missed out on a unique second double. Third-placed Nottingham Forest lifted both the Football League Cup and the Full Members' Cup. The ban on English club teams playing in pan-European competitions, which had been instituted following the Heysel Stadium disaster, was now in its fourth season – and UEFA then voted for it to continue for a fifth season. In April 1989, fourteen Liverpool supporters were convicted of manslaughter relating to the disaster.

The season was overshadowed by the Hillsborough disaster on 15 April 1989, which resulted in the deaths of 97 Liverpool fans in a crowd crush at the FA Cup semi-final there.

== Overview ==
=== Hillsborough disaster ===
On 15 April, a crowd crush at the FA Cup semi-final between Liverpool and Nottingham Forest at Hillsborough killed 94 people and injured more than 300. A 95th Liverpool supporter died in hospital four days later. The death toll became 96 in March 1993, when Tony Bland died after being in a coma for nearly four years, and 97 in July 2021. A subsequent inquiry into the tragedy led to the Taylor Report, in which Lord Justice Taylor of Gosforth ordered that all top-division clubs should have all-seater stadiums from the 1994–95 season onwards.

=== Changes to football on television ===
One of the biggest changes in the history of football on television began in this season, as ITV gained exclusive rights to show Football League matches, both in live and highlights form. The rights cost £11m, up from £5.2m in 1983. Most of its coverage was of live top-flight games on Sunday afternoons. ITV went on to hold the exclusive rights until 1992, when it lost coverage of the newly formed Premier League to Sky.

It ended a long-term partnership with the BBC, which in turn struck up a partnership with the FA for exclusive coverage of the FA Cup. The BBC did not show another live English Football League match until 2009 and would not show another live top-flight football league match until 2020.

=== Scunthorpe's new stadium ===
Scunthorpe United relocated from the Old Showground to Glanford Park in the first relocation of a Football League team since Southend United moved to Roots Hall in 1955.

=== Change in playoff format ===
The play-off system was slightly altered: they were now contested by the four sides just missing out on promotion, with one fewer team automatically promoted. The system has stayed in place since then (although it was not until the following season that Wembley Stadium began hosting finals).

== Diary of the season ==
4 July 1988 – Uruguayan Danny Bergara, 46, becomes the first foreign manager in English football when he takes over at Fourth Division club Rochdale.

5 July 1988 – After three years in Italy with Bari, former Aston Villa striker Paul Rideout returns to England in a £430,000 move to Southampton.

7 July 1988 – Tottenham Hotspur complete a British transfer record £2 million deal for 21-year-old Newcastle United midfielder Paul Gascoigne. Gascoigne signs a contract at White Hart Lane until the end of the 1992–93 season.

12 July 1988 – The long hunt for a new Wales national football team manager ends when Swansea City manager Terry Yorath is appointed on a part-time basis.

13 July 1988 – Gordon Cowans ends his three-year spell at Bari to rejoin Aston Villa in a £250,000 deal, while Everton strengthen their midfield in a £925,000 move for Chelsea and Scotland midfielder Pat Nevin.

19 July 1988 – England defender Gary Stevens moves to Scotland in a £1 million move from Everton to Rangers in the costliest transfer involving a British defender. He is replaced at Goodison Park by Newcastle United's Neil McDonald.

20 July 1988 – After two poor seasons at Barcelona, Mark Hughes returns to Manchester United for a club record £1.8 million, breaking the previous record of £1.75 million that the club paid for Bryan Robson seven years ago.

25 July 1988 – Less than three weeks after Tottenham broke the national transfer record, a new record is set when Everton complete the signing of West Ham United's 23-year-old striker Tony Cottee for £2.2 million.

28 July 1988 – Billy Bonds, the oldest player in the Football League at 41, announces his retirement as a player but will remain with West Ham United as youth team coach.

1 August 1988 – West Ham United sign striker David Kelly from Walsall for £600,000. Newcastle United sign defender Andy Thorn from FA Cup winners Wimbledon for a club record £850,000.

8 August 1988 – Graham Roberts returns to England in a £470,000 move to Chelsea from Rangers.

13 August 1988 – The first North London derby to be held at Wembley Stadium ends in a 4–0 victory for Arsenal in the friendly Wembley International Tournament. The Gunners' goalscorers are Paul Merson, Alan Smith, and Brian Marwood (2).

14 August 1988 – Arsenal beat Bayern Munich 3–0 to win the Wembley International Tournament on goal difference.

17 August 1988 – Nottingham Forest sign England midfielder Steve Hodge from Tottenham Hotspur for £550,000.

18 August 1988 – After an unhappy season at Juventus, Ian Rush returns to Liverpool for £2.8 million. It is the third time in two months that the national transfer fee record has been broken.

20 August 1988 – Liverpool gain revenge for their FA Cup final defeat by Wimbledon in May by beating them 2–1 in the Charity Shield. John Aldridge, who missed a penalty in the FA Cup final, scores both goals for Liverpool, and John Fashanu scores for Wimbledon.

23 August 1988 – Kevin Moran leaves Manchester United on a free transfer after ten years and joins Spanish side Sporting Gijón.

26 August 1988 – Alan Ball prepares Portsmouth's challenge for an immediate return to the First Division by paying Aston Villa £315,000 for striker Warren Aspinall.

27 August 1988 – Millwall begin their life as a First Division side by drawing 2–2 at Aston Villa. Forwards John Aldridge, Alan Smith, and Tony Cottee score opening day hat-tricks as Liverpool beat Charlton Athletic 3–0, Arsenal thrash FA Cup holders Wimbledon 5–1, and Everton thump Newcastle United 4–0. Tottenham Hotspur's opening fixture at home to Coventry City was postponed following the Londoners' failure to obtain a safety certificate for White Hart Lane.

31 August 1988 – Norwich City sign Irish midfielder Andy Townsend from Southampton for £300,000. Chelsea defender Steve Wicks retires from playing due to a back injury.

1 September 1988 – Brighton & Hove Albion, newly promoted back to the Second Division, sign Barnet defender Nicky Bissett for £115,000, a record fee for a non-league player. Richard Thompson, 24, becomes the youngest chairman in the Football League when he takes over at Queens Park Rangers in place of David Bulstrode.

10 September 1988 – In the North London derby at White Hart Lane, Arsenal beat Tottenham Hotspur 3–2. Southampton go top of the First Division after three games with a 2–1 home win over Luton Town. Norwich City hold the First Division's other remaining 100% record by beating QPR 1–0 at Carrow Road. Bryan Robson helps Manchester United achieve their first goal and win of the season with a 1–0 home win over Middlesbrough.

12 September 1988 – Nearly a decade after leaving them for Sunderland, goalkeeper Chris Turner returns to Sheffield Wednesday in a £175,000 move from Manchester United.

16 September 1988 – Andy Gray returns to his native Scotland after 13 years to sign for Rangers.

17 September – Southampton drop points for the first time this season with a 2–2 draw against Arsenal at Highbury, and their midfielder Glenn Cockerill suffers a broken jaw in a clash with Arsenal's Paul Davis. The result allows Norwich to go top with a 2–0 win at Newcastle United, who move to the bottom of the table. Liverpool goalkeeper Bruce Grobbelaar is hospitalised with meningitis and is expected to be out of action until the new year.

24 September – Norwich City drop points for the first time this season but remain top of the First Division with a 2–2 draw at home to third-place Millwall.

28 September 1988 – Wimbledon sign Nottingham Forest goalkeeper Hans Segers for £180,000. Leeds United, fourth from bottom in the Second Division, sack manager Billy Bremner after three years at the helm.

29 September 1988 – Paul Davis is fined a record £3,000 and banned for nine matches for punching Glenn Cockerill in Arsenal's recent League match against Southampton.

30 September 1988 – The month ends with Norwich City as the surprise leaders of the First Division, two points ahead of Liverpool and newly promoted Millwall. FA Cup holders Wimbledon occupy bottom place. The Second Division promotion race is headed by Blackburn Rovers and Watford. Ipswich Town, Portsmouth, Bradford City and Oldham Athletic occupy the promotion play-off places, while pre-season promotion favourites Leeds United occupy a lowly 18th place.

1 October 1988 – Millwall go top of the league in their first season in the First Division with a 3–2 win over Queens Park Rangers. Norwich's 3–1 home defeat to Charlton Athletic pushes them down to second place. West Ham United go bottom of the division with a 4–1 home defeat to Arsenal. Ipswich go top of the Second Division with a 2–1 away win over West Bromwich Albion. Bottom-of-the-table Birmingham lose a thrilling game at home to Barnsley 5–3.

2 October 1988 – Aston Villa sell defender Neale Cooper to Rangers for £300,000.

7 October 1988 – Derby County manager Arthur Cox dismisses speculation that he will take over at Leeds United.

8 October 1988 – Norwich City return to the top of the First Division with a 1–0 win over Derby County at the Baseball Ground. Second Division promotion challengers Blackburn Rovers beat Crystal Palace 5–4 in a nine-goal thriller at Ewood Park.

9 October 1988 – Jackie Milburn, Newcastle's record goal scorer who helped them win three FA Cups during the 1950s, dies of cancer aged 64.

10 October 1988 – Howard Wilkinson ends six years as Sheffield Wednesday manager by agreeing to drop down a division to join Leeds United, while Willie McFaul ends his 22-year association with Newcastle United when he is sacked as manager. Reserve team coach Colin Suggett is put in charge, with the club's board saying that he will stay in the role until the end of the season.

13 October 1988 – Ron Atkinson steps down as West Bromwich Albion manager for the second time, taking over at Atlético Madrid in Spain, in a contract worth £250,000 per year.

15 October 1988 – Millwall miss the chance to go back to the top of the First Division when Coventry hold them to a goalless draw at Highfield Road. A West Midlands derby at St Andrew's sees West Bromwich Albion beat their local rivals Birmingham City 4–1. Chelsea boost their hopes of an immediate return to the First Division by beating Oldham Athletic 4–1 at Boundary Park.

17 October 1988 – Liverpool midfielder Jan Molby is found guilty of reckless driving and driving under the influence of alcohol, and is sentenced to three months in prison.

20 October 1988 – Liverpool sign 20-year-old defender David Burrows from West Bromwich Albion for £550,000.

21 October 1988 – Wimbledon pay a club record £500,000 for Reading defender Keith Curle.

22 October 1988 – Southampton make history by fielding three brothers in the same team in their 2–1 league defeat to Sheffield Wednesday: 24-year-old Danny Wallace lines up alongside twin brothers Rod and Ray. Norwich City maintain their lead of the First Division with a 3–1 home win over Tottenham Hotspur, which sends the visitors into the bottom three. West Ham United remain in the bottom three despite a 2–0 win over Newcastle United, which sends the Tynesiders back to the bottom of the table. Chelsea's Second Division surge continues with a 5–0 home win over Plymouth Argyle.

25 October 1988 – Tottenham Hotspur remain in the bottom three after losing 2–1 at home to Southampton, who climb from tenth place to fifth. Arsenal's title hopes are dented when they are held to a 1–1 draw by Luton Town at Kenilworth Road. Watford go top of the Second Division with a 4–0 home win over Barnsley.

26 October 1988 – Norwich City strengthen their lead of the First Division with a 2–1 win over Manchester United at Old Trafford. Newcastle United climb off the bottom of the division with a 3–0 home win over local rivals Middlesbrough. Liverpool are seventh after a 2–1 defeat to Nottingham Forest at the City Ground.

27 October 1988 – Manchester United pay Luton Town £650,000 for 31-year-old full-back Mal Donaghy.

28 October 1988 – Derby County pay a club-record £1million for Oxford United and Wales striker Dean Saunders.

29 October 1988 – Mark Lawrenson is sacked as Oxford United manager after a dispute with the club's board over the sale of Dean Saunders. His assistant Brian Horton, the former Hull City manager, is appointed as his successor. First Division leaders Norwich City draw 1–1 at home to Southampton, while Arsenal climb into second place with a 2–0 home win over Coventry City. Liverpool get back on track with a 2–0 win at West Ham United. In the Second Division, there is a seven-goal thriller at the Manor Ground, where Bradford City beat Oxford United 4–3.

30 October 1988 – Everton and Manchester United draw 1–1 in a First Division encounter at Goodison Park. Both teams were among the pre-season title favourites but have so far been disappointing in the league, with Everton 14th and United 10th. Tottenham Hotspur, another team widely expected to challenge for the title this season, are currently second from bottom.

31 October 1988 – Norwich City are back at the top of the First Division table at the end of the month, now with a six-point lead over nearest rivals Arsenal, who have a game in hand, while Millwall are still third. The bottom three places are occupied by Newcastle United, Tottenham Hotspur and West Ham United. Middlesbrough, who two seasons ago were in the Third Division and threatened with closure due to financial problems, finish the month in a creditable seventh place. Watford lead the Second Division by five points over Blackburn Rovers. The playoff zone is occupied by West Bromwich Albion, Portsmouth, Chelsea and Manchester City. Leeds United continue to struggle, only being out of the relegation zone on goal difference.

1 November 1988 – Out-of-favour Manchester United striker Peter Davenport becomes Middlesbrough's record signing in a £750,000 deal. Former Tottenham Hotspur manager Keith Burkinshaw takes over as manager of Third Division strugglers Gillingham.

5 November 1988 – In the Second Division, Chelsea win at league leaders Watford through goals from Gordon Durie and Kerry Dixon, Tommy Tynan fires four for Plymouth Argyle against Blackburn Rovers, and John Sheridan scores the only goal as Leeds United pick up an away win at Ipswich Town. Norwich City continue to head the First Division title race with a 2–0 win over Wimbledon at Plough Lane. Millwall go second with a 3–1 home win over Luton. Tottenham Hotspur are bottom after a 3–1 home defeat to Derby County, which sees the East Midlanders bounce from 13th to sixth in the table. Manchester United's frustrating form continues when they are held to a 1–1 draw at home to Aston Villa, meaning that they have now drawn five out of 10 First Division games this season.

6 November 1988 – Arsenal go second in the First Division with a 4–1 away over Nottingham Forest. They are now Norwich's nearest challengers, six points behind with a game in hand.

11 November 1988 – Ralph Milne, the 27-year-old winger with Bristol City in the Third Division, makes a surprise £170,000 move to Manchester United.

12 November 1988 – Norwich City are still top of the First Division but draw 1–1 at home to Sheffield Wednesday, with Arsenal winning 1–0 at Newcastle United to cut Norwich's lead to four points. Southampton go third win a 3–1 home win over Aston Villa. Manchester United make it six draws from their first 11 games with a 2–2 stalemate away to Derby County.

15 November 1988 – Everton striker Adrian Heath is sold to Espanyol of Spain for £600,000.

16 November 1988 – Manchester United sell winger Jesper Olsen to Bordeaux of France for £400,000, where he links up with former Tottenham Hotspur striker Clive Allen.

18 November 1988 – Oxford United captain Tommy Caton returns to the First Division in a £100,000 move to Charlton Athletic. Manchester United sell Danish winger Jesper Olsen to Bordeaux for £400,000.

19 November 1988 – The FA Cup first round kicks off with non-league Altrincham and Bognor Regis Town both seeing off Football League opposition. Norwich drop points again when they are held to a 1–1 draw at Everton, with Arsenal cutting the gap between first and second to two points with a 3–0 home win over Middlesbrough. A relegation crunch game at Kenilworth Road sees Luton Town beat West Ham United 4–1. Bottom club Newcastle United crash to a 4–0 defeat at Millwall. Portsmouth go top of the Second Division, level on points with Watford and Blackburn, with a 3–0 home win over Barnsley.

23 November 1988 – Manchester United are held to a 1–1 draw at home to Sheffield Wednesday in the First Division, and have now drawn eight of their opening 13 league games. Tottenham Hotspur and Coventry City draw 1–1 in a stalemate at White Hart Lane. Liverpool beat Arsenal 2–1 in a League Cup third round replay at Villa Park.

25 November 1988 – Wimbledon defender Terry Phelan is omitted from tomorrow's squad for the First Division fixture against Liverpool due to a court appearance he faces on a charge of cannabis possession.

26 November 1988 – Norwich City are held to another draw, this time 2–2 at home to Luton Town, but retain their lead of the First Division. Arsenal lose 2–1 to Derby County at the Baseball Ground in a match where victory would have taken them to the top of the league on goal difference. Coventry City go fifth with a 2–1 home win over local rivals Aston Villa. There are thrilling victories for two promotion-chasing teams in the Second Division, with Barnsley beating Bournemouth 5–2 at Oakwell and West Bromwich Albion beating Crystal Palace 5–3 at the Hawthorns.

27 November 1988 – The only professional action of the day sees Manchester United and Newcastle United grind out a goalless draw on Tyneside. Newcastle are still bottom of the First Division, having won just two of their first 14 games. Manchester United have so far lost just twice in the league, but nine draws and a mere three victories have left them rooted in mid table.

30 November 1988 – The month ends with Norwich City still top of the First Division, with Arsenal, Millwall, Liverpool, Coventry City and Southampton all in close contention. Newcastle United and West Ham United are level on points at the bottom. Watford and Blackburn Rovers lead the way in the Second Division, level on 33 points. Manchester City, Chelsea, Portsmouth and West Bromwich Albion occupy the play-off zone.

1 December 1988 – Jan Molby is released from prison after serving 45 days of his three-month prison sentence for motoring offences.

3 December 1988 – Manchester United end their long run without a win in the First Division by beating Charlton Athletic 3–0 at Old Trafford. Norwich City are still top of the First Division despite a 3–1 defeat at Aston Villa, but Arsenal are three points behind them with two games in hand. Chelsea go second in the Second Division with a 3–0 win over Stoke City at the Victoria Ground.

4 December 1988 – Newcastle United's search for a manager ends when they recruit Jim Smith from Queens Park Rangers, who put coach Peter Shreeves in temporary charge of the first team. Arsenal miss the chance to go top of the First Division when they are held to a 1–1 draw at home to Liverpool.

7 December 1988 – Striker John Robertson returns to his native Scotland to rejoin Hearts in a £750,000 deal after just seven months at Newcastle United.

10 December 1988 – Norwich City remain top of the First Division after drawing 0–0 at home with their nearest rivals Arsenal. Coventry City close in on the leading pair by beating Manchester United 1–0 at Highfield Road. Manchester City go top of the Second Division with a 4–0 home win over Bradford City.

11 December 1988 – The Merseyside derby ends in a 1–1 draw at Anfield.

14 December 1988 – Luton Town sign 23-year-old Northern Irish striker Iain Dowie from Isthmian League side Hendon for £30,000. Queens Park Rangers appoint their 34-year-old former England striker Trevor Francis as player-manager.

17 December 1988 – Liverpool are now sixth in the First Division and eight points off the top of the table after losing 1–0 at home to Norwich City, who stay top despite Arsenal's 2–1 home win over Manchester United. Derby County go fourth win a 2–0 away win over Coventry City. Newcastle United claim a point in their battle for survival with a 3–3 draw at home to Southampton. Millwall remain third in the league with a 1–0 home win over Sheffield Wednesday.

18 December 1988 – Wimbledon climb out of the bottom three with a 1–0 away win over Nottingham Forest. Sunderland remain within touching distance of the Second Division playoffs – and the chance of a second successive promotion – by beating Plymout Argyle 4–1 at Home Park. West Bromwich Albion keep up their push for automatic promotion with a 6–0 home win over Stoke City.

22 December 1988 – Kenny Sansom ends eight years at Arsenal by making a £300,000 move to Newcastle United.

24 December 1988 – Aston Villa sell striker Garry Thompson to Watford for £325,000.

26 December 1988 – Arsenal go top of the First Division after beating Charlton Athletic 3–2 at Selhurst Park. Everton go fifth win a 2–1 home win over Middlesbrough. Manchester United climb two places to ninth with a 2–0 home win over Nottingham Forest. Newcastle United pick up three vital points in their fight to avoid relegation by winning 2–1 at Sheffield Wednesday. Liverpool pick up three points in their bid to remain on track for the league title, beating Derby County 1–0 at the Baseball Ground. Chelsea go top of the Second Division with a 3–0 home win over Ipswich Town.

27 December 1988 – Walsall, bottom of the Second Division, sack manager Tommy Coakley, their manager for two-and-a-half years, after an 11th successive league defeat. Norwich return to the top of the First Division with a 2–1 home win over West Ham, who are now bottom of the First Division and six points adrift of safety just three seasons after coming close to winning the league title.

31 December 1988 – Arsenal move to the top the First Division on goal difference from Norwich City after beating Aston Villa 3–0. Norwich could only manage a goalless draw at home to Middlesbrough. Wimbledon climb into 14th place with a 4–0 home win over Luton Town, Everton go fourth win a 3–1 home win over Coventry City, and Tottenham reach ninth place with a 2–0 win over Newcastle United less than two months after being bottom of the table. The Second Division leading pair of Chelsea and West Bromwich Albion remain level on goal difference after a 1–1 draw at Stamford Bridge. Watford draw level on points with them after beating AFC Bournemouth 1–0. Manchester City maintain their promotion push with a 2–1 win over Swindon at the County Ground. Leicester City are just four points short of the playoffs after a 4–0 home win over Blackburn Rovers. Sunderland are just two points off the playoffs after beating Portsmouth 4–0 at Roker Park. Barnsley climb into the playoff zone and are in strong contention for a place in the top flight of English football for the first time, beating struggling Shrewsbury 3–2 at Gay Meadow.

1 January 1989 – Manchester United beat Liverpool 3–1 at Old Trafford to leave the Merseysiders nine points behind leaders Arsenal. 20-year-old midfielder Russell Beardsmore, starting for only the second time in the league, scored a second half equaliser for United before setting up a goal each for Brian McClair and Mark Hughes to wipe out Liverpool's lead.

2 January 1989 – Luton Town thrash Southampton 6–1 in the biggest win of the First Division season.

5 January 1989 – Neil Warnock leaves Scarborough to become manager of Notts County, to replace John Barnwell, sacked a month ago.

6 January 1989 – Manchester City boost their Second Division promotion push with a £250,000 move for Sheffield Wednesday midfielder Gary Megson.

7 January 1989 – Sutton United, of the Conference, knock Coventry City out of the FA Cup with a shock 2–1 win in the third round. Middlesbrough lose 2–1 at home to Fourth Division Grimsby Town.

11 January 1989 – Struggling West Ham United surprisingly beat Arsenal 1–0 in an FA Cup third round replay at Highbury.

12 January 1989 – After just seven months at Newcastle United, goalkeeper Dave Beasant signs for Second Division leaders Chelsea in a £725,000 deal which contracts him to the Stamford Bridge club until 1994.

28 January 1989 – Sutton United's FA Cup adventure ends in the Fourth Round when they are hammered 8–0 by Norwich City. Brentford beat Manchester City 3–1.

31 January 1989 – Arsenal remain top of the First Division, three points ahead of Norwich City. Coventry City are third, but Millwall have slipped to seventh. Newcastle United are back in bottom place after failing to gain a single league point this month, and are level on points with West Ham United. Chelsea continue to lead the way in the Second Division, while Watford now stand second, level on points with third placed Manchester City. West Bromwich Albion, Blackburn Rovers and Sunderland complete the top six.

2 February 1989 – Liverpool sell midfielder Nigel Spackman to Queens Park Rangers for £500,000.

8 February 1989 – Midfielder Peter Reid moves from Everton to Queens Park Rangers on a free transfer. Watford boost their Second Division promotion challenge with a £175,000 move for Halifax Town's 19-year-old winger Lee Richardson.

9 February 1989 – Nottingham Forest manager Brian Clough is fined £5,000 and banned from the touchline for the rest of the season for punching supporters who invaded the pitch in the recent League Cup quarter-final victory over Queens Park Rangers.

14 February 1989 – Just three months after quitting West Bromwich Albion to take over at Spanish side Atlético Madrid, Ron Atkinson returns to England to succeed Peter Eustace as manager of First Division strugglers Sheffield Wednesday. Arsenal win a friendly against the France national football team 2–0.

18 February 1989 – Liverpool come from behind to beat Hull City 3–2 in the FA Cup fifth round. Everton win 1–0 at Barnsley, and Third Division Brentford continue their good run by beating Blackburn Rovers.

23 February 1989 – Midfielder Carlton Palmer follows Ron Atkinson to Sheffield Wednesday from West Bromwich Albion for a club record fee of £750,000.

24 February 1989 – Roy Hattersley, deputy Labour Party leader, warns that the Conservative government's proposed ID card scheme will increase violence outside football grounds.

27 February 1989 – Newport County, relegated from the Football League last season, are wound up in the High Court with huge debts.

28 February 1989 – Arsenal remain top of the First Division as February ends, with Norwich City still second, and Millwall back up to third. Liverpool are eighth, 19 points behind Arsenal, but with four games in hand. West Ham United are now bottom of the division, and Newcastle United and Sheffield Wednesday complete the relegation zone. Manchester City have overtaken Chelsea as Second Division leaders. The play-off zone is occupied by Blackburn Rovers, Watford, West Bromwich Albion and AFC Bournemouth.

2 March 1989 – Chelsea sign Dutch defender Ken Monkou from Feyenoord for £100,000.

3 March 1989 – Rangers sign defender Mel Sterland from Sheffield Wednesday on a free.

9 March 1989 – Queens Park Rangers set a club record transfer by paying Southampton £800,000 for striker Colin Clarke.

14 March 1989 – Manchester City, pushing for promotion from the Second Division, pay £600,000 for Luton Town midfielder David Oldfield.

15 March 1989 – Southampton sign 18-year-old defender Jason Dodd from Conference side Bath City for £50,000.

18 March 1989 – Brentford's FA Cup dream ends in the quarter-finals when they lose 4–0 to Liverpool at Anfield. Nottingham Forest defeat Manchester United 1–0 at Old Trafford. West Ham United and Norwich City draw 0–0 at Upton Park.

19 March 1989 – Wimbledon's defence of the FA Cup ends in a 1–0 defeat to Everton at Goodison Park.

21 March 1989 – Fourth Division strugglers Stockport County sack player-manager Asa Hartford and replace him with Rochdale manager Danny Bergera.

22 March 1989 – Norwich City move closer to their first FA Cup final by defeating West Ham United 3–1 in the quarter-final replay at Carrow Road. while Southampton pay a club record £700,000 for Portsmouth midfielder Barry Horne. West Ham United also break their transfer fee record by paying £1.1million to bring striker Frank McAvennie back to the club after 18 months at Celtic.

23 March 1989 – Gordon Strachan leaves Manchester United after nearly five years to join Leeds United for £300,000. Trevor Francis bolsters the Queens Park Rangers midfield with a £350,000 move for Brentford's Andy Sinton.

27 March 1989 – Referee Kelvin Morton awards five penalties in just 27 minutes during the Crystal Palace versus Brighton & Hove Albion match. Crystal Palace miss three of their four penalties, while Brighton score from their only penalty. Palace eventually win the match 2–1.

31 March 1989 – Arsenal remain top of the league, three points ahead of Norwich City, while Liverpool, who won six League games this month, have moved into third place with a game in hand and a five-point deficit behind the leaders. West Ham United occupy bottom place with 22 points from 27 games, but Newcastle United are now just one point adrift of safety. Southampton have slipped into the bottom three. Chelsea have returned to the top of the Second Division, exchanging places with Manchester City, while the play-off zone is occupied by West Bromwich Albion, Blackburn Rovers, Ipswich Town and AFC Bournemouth.

4 April 1989 – Liverpool play Scottish champions Celtic in the last Dubai Champions Cup, an unofficial "British Championship". John Aldridge scores for Liverpool to equalise a Mark McGhee goal for Celtic, and the game finishes 1–1. Liverpool lose 4–2 on penalty kicks.

5 April 1989 – Newport County lose a final appeal against their closure in the High Court more than a month ago; they are expelled from the GM Vauxhall Conference and their record for the season is expunged.

9 April 1989 – Nottingham Forest win the League Cup with a 3–1 win over holders Luton Town in the final at Wembley.

10 April 1989 – Walsall announce the sale of Fellows Park, their home since 1903, and will relocate to a new stadium at Bescot from the start of the 1990–91 season.

15 April 1989 – English football endures its greatest ever tragedy with the death of 94 Liverpool supporters, and injury of some 300 others, at the FA Cup semi-final clash with Nottingham Forest at Hillsborough. Some of the injured are in a serious condition and there are fears that the death toll could rise even higher. The match is abandoned, while the other semi-final sees Everton beat Norwich City 1–0 at Villa Park.

17 April 1989 – Within 48 hours of the tragedy at Hillsborough, Home Secretary Douglas Hurd promises to pass new legislation which will force all Football League teams to remove standing accommodation from their stadiums. The Football Association gives the go-ahead for the FA Cup to continue, with the re-staged match to take place at Old Trafford on 7 May, despite calls for the final not to be played.

18 April 1989 – The Hillsborough disaster death toll reaches 95 when 14-year-old Lee Nicol dies in hospital from his injuries. Many more of the injured are still in hospital, and there are fears that six spectators who had to be resuscitated have suffered brain damage.

19 April 1989 – The Sun newspaper posts a front-page article about the Hillsborough disaster, headlined "The Truth", with lurid and untrue allegations about Liverpool fans' conduct, from sources including South Yorkshire Police and Conservative MP Irvine Patnick. The claims were later disproved by the Hillsborough inquest, and caused an ongoing boycott of The Sun in Liverpool.

28 April 1989 – Of the 25 Liverpool fans who were extradited in connection with the Heysel disaster of May 1985, in which 39 spectators died at the European Cup final, 14 are found guilty of voluntary manslaughter; they went on to serve one year in prison.

30 April 1989 – Arsenal remain top of the league as April draws to a close, but are now just three points ahead of a Liverpool side who have superior goal difference and a game in hand. Norwich City are now eight points behind the leaders. At the other end of the table West Ham United are ten points from safety, and occupy the relegation zone with Newcastle United and Luton Town. Chelsea have sealed an immediate return to the First Division as Second Division champions, while Manchester City are just five points away from returning as runners-up after a two-year exile. Watford and Crystal Palace are now the only other teams who can go up automatically, while Blackburn Rovers and Swindon Town complete the top six. Nottingham Forest beat Everton 4–3 in the Full Members Cup final at Wembley to become the first club in English football to win two domestic cups in the same season. Liverpool travelled to Glasgow to play their first game since the Hillsborough disaster. 60,000 attend at Parkhead to watch them beat Celtic 4–0 in a match arranged to raise money for the disaster fund. An estimated £500,000 is raised.

1 May 1989 – Arsenal thrash Norwich City 5–0 at Highbury to effectively end the Canaries' title challenge. Maidstone United clinch the Conference title and are promoted to the Football League, giving them a clash next season with fellow Kent club Gillingham, who are relegated to the Fourth Division on the same day.

2 May 1989 – Manchester United beat Wimbledon 1–0 in a league game at Old Trafford which is watched by 23,368, the club's lowest home crowd in the league since August 1971.

3 May 1989 – Liverpool play their first match since the Hillsborough tragedy, a 0–0 draw with Everton. Newcastle United are relegated from the First Division after losing 2–1 to West Ham United, whose victory keeps their own slim survival hopes alive.

6 May 1989 – Darlington are relegated from the Football League after 68 years when they lose 5–1 to Scunthorpe United at Glanford Park.

7 May 1989 – Three weeks after the Hillsborough disaster, Liverpool's FA Cup semi-final clash with Nottingham Forest is replayed at Old Trafford. Liverpool win 3–1 to keep their dream of a second double alive.

10 May 1989 – England striker Gary Lineker collects a European Cup Winners' Cup medal as Barcelona beat Sampdoria 2–0 in the final.

13 May 1989 – Middlesbrough join Newcastle United in being relegated from the First Division after they lose a relegation showdown 1–0 away to Sheffield Wednesday and Luton Town beat Norwich City 1–0. The result ensures Wednesday's survival, and West Ham United must now win their last two games to stay up at the expense of Aston Villa. At the top, Arsenal suffer a 2–1 defeat at home to Derby County, while Liverpool beat Wimbledon 2–1 to move within two points of the Gunners with a game in hand.

16 May 1989 – Liverpool move to the top of the First Division for the first time this season after beating Queens Park Rangers 2–0.

17 May 1989 – Arsenal draw 2–2 with Wimbledon in their last home League game of the season. They are level on points with Liverpool having played one game more.

20 May 1989 – Liverpool lift the FA Cup with a 3–2 win over Everton after extra time. Ian Rush scores twice for Liverpool while John Aldridge scores the other goal, and Stuart McCall scores twice for Everton.

23 May 1989 – West Ham United are relegated after eight successive seasons of First Division football as they lose 5–1 to Liverpool at Anfield. The result moves Liverpool three points clear of Arsenal at the top of the table with one game remaining.

26 May 1989 – Arsenal win the league title in the final moments of the season thanks to a late goal from Michael Thomas against Liverpool which gives them a 2–0 away win. First Division top scorer Alan Smith had put Arsenal ahead earlier in the second half. Their triumph gives them their first league championship trophy for 18 years, having scored more goals than their rivals, their points tallies and goal differences being identical. Former Leeds United and England manager Don Revie dies of motor neuron disease at the age of 61.

28 May 1989 – Bolton Wanderers claim their first major trophy since the 1958 FA Cup by beating Torquay United 4–1 in the Associate Members' Cup final.

1 June 1989 – Trevor Steven, the Everton winger, becomes the latest Englishman to sign for Rangers when he agrees terms for a £1.5 million transfer. Kenny Sansom leaves Newcastle United to return to London in an exchange deal to Queens Park Rangers, with Wayne Fereday moving in the opposite direction.

3 June 1989 – The domestic season draws to a close when Crystal Palace overhaul a 3–1 deficit to defeat Blackburn Rovers 4–3 on aggregate to win promotion to the First Division after an eight-year exile. 5 June 1989 – John Lyall, the longest-serving manager currently employed in the Football League, is sacked after 15 years in charge of relegated West Ham United. He had been with the club for 34 years, since joining them as an apprentice on leaving school in 1955 at the age of 15.

7 June 1989 – Sheffield Wednesday sign 20-year-old striker Dalian Atkinson from Ipswich Town for £450,000.

20 June 1989 – Leeds United sign midfielder Vinnie Jones from Wimbledon for £650,000.

21 June 1989 – Gary Lineker ends three years in Spain with Barcelona to return to England in a £2 million move to Tottenham Hotspur.

30 June 1989 – Billy Bremner is appointed manager of Doncaster Rovers for the second time succeeding caretaker manager Joe Kinnear.

== National team ==
David Rocastle, Paul Gascoigne and Tony Cottee won their first international caps for England in a 1–0 friendly win over Denmark at Wembley.

England began their World Cup qualifying campaign with a goalless draw in Group 2 against Sweden at Wembley. England drew 1–1 with Saudi Arabia in a friendly in Riyadh, with goalkeeper David Seaman making his international debut.

England achieved their first wins of the World Cup qualifying series by defeating Albania 2–0 in Tirana and 5–0 at Wembley. Substitute Paul Gascoigne scored his first international goal in the latter game.

Steve Bull, who scored 52 goals in all competitions for Third Division Wolverhampton Wanderers this season, scored on his international debut for England against Scotland at Hampden Park. England won 2–0 to take the Rous Cup. England then made it three wins from their opening four World Cup qualifying games with a 3–0 win over Poland at Wembley.

== FA Cup ==
Liverpool won the Cup by beating Everton 3–2 at Wembley. Ian Rush, who had returned to Anfield after a year at Juventus the previous summer, scored twice. This year's FA Cup featured a famous upset as First Division Coventry City, who had won the competition two years earlier, sunk to a 2–1 loss in the third round at lowly Sutton United. The joy of the non-leaguers was ended emphatically though in the next round as they were thumped 8–0 by Norwich City. Also, Third Division Brentford went on an impressive run to the quarter-finals before losing to Liverpool at Anfield.

== Football League silverware ==
Brian Clough's Nottingham Forest ended their nine-year trophy drought by beating holders Luton Town 3–1 in the final to win the League Cup. Nottingham Forest also won the Full Members' Cup, beating Everton 4–3 in the final after extra time, having come twice from behind. Garry Parker scored a brilliant goal for Nottingham Forest, running nearly the full length of the Wembley pitch, before beating Neville Southall in the Everton goal. This is arguably one of the best goals scored in a Wembley final.

Like Wolverhampton Wanderers the previous season, Bolton Wanderers announced their intentions to return to the big time by winning the Associate Members' Cup at Wembley against Torquay United 4–1.

== Football League ==
=== First Division ===
An exciting League season was eventually won by Arsenal, who clinched the title on number of goals scored with a late goal from midfielder Michael Thomas on the final day of the season at Liverpool, six weeks after the death of more than 90 fans at the FA Cup semi-final at Hillsborough, which delayed the end of the league season by two weeks and meant that the last games were played six days after the FA Cup Final, in which Liverpool beat Merseyside rivals Everton 3–2. It was Arsenal's first league title for 18 years.

Nottingham Forest's title challenge was over by the end of April, by which time it was a two-horse race between Arsenal and Liverpool, but compensated for this by winning the Football League Cup and Full Members Cup to end nine years without a major trophy. Fourth placed Norwich City mounted the first serious top flight title challenge of their history and although their challenge was over some weeks before the season's end, their final position was their best until they finished third in the inaugural Premier League season. They also reached the FA Cup semi-finals for only the second time. Derby County completed the top five to secure their best finish since finishing fourth in 1976.

Coventry City enjoyed their best season since 1977–78 with a seventh-place finish, unlike Everton whose eighth-place finish was their lowest since 1981. Newly promoted Millwall finished tenth following a strong start to the season.

A disastrous season for Newcastle United saw them relegated in bottom place after five years back in the First Division. They were relegated alongside local rivals Middlesbrough and a West Ham United side who had almost won the league title three years earlier, and who then sacked their manager John Lyall after 15 years in charge. Aston Villa, Luton Town, Sheffield Wednesday (who went through three managers in the season) and Charlton Athletic all had narrow escapes from relegation.

Pos	Team	Pld	W	D	L	GF	GA	GD	Pts	Qualification or relegation
1	Arsenal (C)	38	22	10	6	73	36	+37	76	Disqualified from the European Cup
2	Liverpool (Note: Liverpool would have qualified as FA Cup winners.)	38	22	10	6	65	28	+37	76	Disqualified from the European Cup Winners' Cup
3	Nottingham Forest (Note: Nottingham Forest would have qualified as League Cup winners.)	38	17	13	8	64	43	+21	64	Disqualified from the UEFA Cup
4	Norwich City	38	17	11	10	48	45	+3	62	Disqualified from the UEFA Cup
5	Derby County	38	17	7	14	40	38	+2	58	
6	Tottenham Hotspur	38	15	12	11	60	46	+14	57	
7	Coventry City	38	14	13	11	47	42	+5	55	
8	Everton	38	14	12	12	50	45	+5	54	
9	Queens Park Rangers	38	14	11	13	43	37	+6	53	
10	Millwall	38	14	11	13	47	52	−5	53	
11	Manchester United	38	13	12	13	45	35	+10	51	
12	Wimbledon	38	14	9	15	50	46	+4	51	
13	Southampton	38	10	15	13	52	66	−14	45	
14	Charlton Athletic	38	10	12	16	44	58	−14	42	
15	Sheffield Wednesday	38	10	12	16	34	51	−17	42	
16	Luton Town	38	10	11	17	42	52	−10	41	
17	Aston Villa	38	9	13	16	45	56	−11	40	
18	Middlesbrough (R)	38	9	12	17	44	61	−17	39	Relegation to the Second Division
19	West Ham United (R)	38	10	8	20	37	62	−25	38	Relegation to the Second Division
20	Newcastle United (R)	38	7	10	21	32	63	−31	31	Relegation to the Second Division

Source: World Football
Rules for classification: 1) Points; 2) Goal difference; 3) Goals scored
(C) Champions; (R) Relegated

=== Second Division ===
Chelsea sealed an instant return to the First Division by topping the Second Division with 99 points, giving them a 17-point lead over second-placed Manchester City. The final promotion place went to Crystal Palace, whose manager Steve Coppell had gradually rebuilt the club since taking over as manager five years earlier. They overcame Blackburn Rovers in the two-legged final by overhauling a two-goal deficit and prolonging the Lancashire club's absence from the First Division into its 24th season. West Bromwich had looked all set for promotion as late as February, only for a late season collapse to drag them down to ninth in the final table – not even enough for a playoff place.

Walsall suffered an instant return to the Third Division after winning just five league games all season, while Birmingham City's decline continued as they fell into the Third Division for the first time. The last club to go down were Shrewsbury Town, whose luck finally ran out after defying the odds at this level for a whole decade, while some of the game's most illustrious clubs had gone down before them.

Pos	Team	Pld	W	D	L	GF	GA	GD	Pts	Qualification or relegation
1	Chelsea (C, P)	46	29	12	5	96	50	+46	99	Promotion to the First Division
2	Manchester City (P)	46	23	13	10	77	53	+24	82	Promotion to the First Division
3	Crystal Palace (O, P)	46	23	12	11	71	49	+22	81	Qualification for the Second Division play-offs
4	Watford	46	22	12	12	74	48	+26	78	Qualification for the Second Division play-offs
5	Blackburn Rovers	46	22	11	13	74	59	+15	77	Qualification for the Second Division play-offs
6	Swindon Town	46	20	16	10	68	53	+15	76	Qualification for the Second Division play-offs
7	Barnsley	46	20	14	12	66	58	+8	74	
8	Ipswich Town	46	22	7	17	71	61	+10	73	
9	West Bromwich Albion	46	18	18	10	65	41	+24	72	
10	Leeds United	46	17	16	13	59	50	+9	67	
11	Sunderland	46	16	15	15	60	60	0	63	
12	Bournemouth	46	18	8	20	53	62	−9	62	
13	Stoke City	46	15	14	17	57	72	−15	59	
14	Bradford City	46	13	17	16	52	59	−7	56	
15	Leicester City	46	13	16	17	56	63	−7	55	
16	Oldham Athletic	46	11	21	14	75	72	+3	54	
17	Oxford United	46	14	12	20	62	70	−8	54	
18	Plymouth Argyle	46	14	12	20	55	66	−11	54	
19	Brighton & Hove Albion	46	14	9	23	57	66	−9	51	
20	Portsmouth	46	13	12	21	53	62	−9	51	
21	Hull City	46	11	14	21	52	68	−16	47	
22	Shrewsbury Town (R)	46	8	18	20	40	67	−27	42	Relegation to the Third Division
23	Birmingham City (R)	46	8	11	27	31	76	−45	35	Relegation to the Third Division
24	Walsall (R)	46	5	16	25	41	80	−39	31	Relegation to the Third Division

Source: thestatcat.co.uk
Rules for classification: 1) Points; 2) Goal difference; 3) Goals scored
(C) Champions; (O) Play-off winners; (P) Promoted; (R) Relegated

==== Second Division playoffs ====
Semi-finals; 1st leg –21 May; 2nd leg –24 May 1989
3rd	Crystal Palace	0	2	2
6th	Swindon Town	1	0	1
4th	Watford	0	1	1
5th	Blackburn Rovers	0	1	1

Finals; 1st leg –31 May; 2nd leg –3 June 1989
3rd	Crystal Palace	1	3	4
5th	Blackburn Rovers	3	0	3

=== Third Division ===
Wolverhampton Wanderers continued to thrive after a traumatic few seasons which had almost put the club out of business, as they sealed a second successive promotion and a second successive title, making them the first club to win all four professional divisions of English football, thanks largely to prolific striker Steve Bull, who became the first player in senior football to reach the 50-goal mark in consecutive seasons. They were joined in the Second Division by runners-up Sheffield United, whose manager Dave Bassett secured his fifth promotion in nine seasons as a manager. Port Vale compensated for missing out on automatic promotion on goal difference by winning the playoffs.

Northampton Town, promotion contenders the previous season, only survived on goal difference. Southend United were relegated instead. Gillingham, Chesterfield and Aldershot completed the bottom four.

Pos	Team	Pld	W	D	L	GF	GA	GD	Pts	Promotion or relegation
1	Wolverhampton Wanderers (C, P)	46	26	14	6	96	49	+47	92	Promotion to the Second Division
2	Sheffield United (P)	46	25	9	12	93	54	+39	84	Promotion to the Second Division
3	Port Vale (O, P)	46	24	12	10	78	48	+30	84	Qualification for the Third Division play-offs
4	Fulham	46	22	9	15	69	67	+2	75	Qualification for the Third Division play-offs
5	Bristol Rovers	46	19	17	10	67	51	+16	74	Qualification for the Third Division play-offs
6	Preston North End	46	19	15	12	79	60	+19	72	Qualification for the Third Division play-offs
7	Brentford	46	18	14	14	66	61	+5	68	
8	Chester City	46	19	11	16	64	61	+3	68	
9	Notts County	46	18	13	15	64	54	+10	67	
10	Bolton Wanderers	46	16	16	14	58	54	+4	64	
11	Bristol City	46	18	9	19	53	55	−2	63	
12	Swansea City	46	15	16	15	51	53	−2	61	Qualification for the European Cup Winners' Cup first round
13	Bury	46	16	13	17	55	67	−12	61	
14	Huddersfield Town	46	17	9	20	63	73	−10	60	
15	Mansfield Town	46	14	17	15	48	52	−4	59	
16	Cardiff City	46	14	15	17	44	56	−12	57	
17	Wigan Athletic	46	14	14	18	55	53	+2	56	
18	Reading	46	15	11	20	68	72	−4	56	
19	Blackpool	46	14	13	19	56	59	−3	55	
20	Northampton Town	46	16	6	24	66	76	−10	54	
21	Southend United (R)	46	13	15	18	56	75	−19	54	Relegation to the Fourth Division
22	Chesterfield (R)	46	14	7	25	51	86	−35	49	Relegation to the Fourth Division
23	Gillingham (R)	46	12	4	30	47	81	−34	40	Relegation to the Fourth Division
24	Aldershot (R)	46	8	13	25	48	78	−30	37	Relegation to the Fourth Division

(C) Champions; (O) Play-off winners; (P) Promoted; (R) Relegated

==== Third Division playoffs ====
Semi-finals; 1st leg –21/22 May; 2nd leg –25 May 1989
3rd	Port Vale	1	3	4
6th	Preston North End	1	1	2
4th	Fulham	0	0	0
5th	Bristol Rovers	1	4	5

Finals; 1st leg –31 May; 2nd leg –3 June 1989
3rd	Port Vale	1	1	2
5th	Bristol Rovers	1	0	1

=== Fourth Division ===
Rotherham United secured an instant return to the Third Division as Fourth Division champions. Tranmere Rovers finished runners-up to end the decade on a high by winning promotion from a division where they had spent most of the decade. Crewe Alexandra finally made it out of the Fourth Division at the right end after being there continuously for over 20 years. Leyton Orient triumphed in the playoffs less than three months after they had been 15th in the league and seemingly out of the promotion race.

Darlington slipped out of the Football League after a late rally by Colchester United under Jock Wallace. Darlington themselves had enjoyed a late improvement in form after Brian Little's appointment as manager but were unable to recover from an abysmal run that saw them win just two league games prior to Little's appointment in mid-February.

Pos	Team	Pld	W	D	L	GF	GA	GD	Pts	Promotion or relegation
1	Rotherham United (C, P)	46	22	16	8	76	35	+41	82	Promotion to the Third Division
2	Tranmere Rovers (P)	46	21	17	8	62	43	+19	80	Promotion to the Third Division
3	Crewe Alexandra (P)	46	21	15	10	67	48	+19	78	Promotion to the Third Division
4	Scunthorpe United	46	21	14	11	77	57	+20	77	Qualification for the Fourth Division play-offs
5	Scarborough	46	21	14	11	67	52	+15	77	Qualification for the Fourth Division play-offs
6	Leyton Orient (O, P)	46	21	12	13	86	50	+36	75	Qualification for the Fourth Division play-offs
7	Wrexham	46	19	14	13	77	63	+14	71	Qualification for the Fourth Division play-offs
8	Cambridge United	46	18	14	14	71	62	+9	68	
9	Grimsby Town	46	17	15	14	65	59	+6	66	
10	Lincoln City	46	18	10	18	64	60	+4	64	
11	York City	46	17	13	16	62	63	−1	64	
12	Carlisle United	46	15	15	16	53	52	+1	60	
13	Exeter City	46	18	6	22	65	68	−3	60	
14	Torquay United	46	17	8	21	45	60	−15	59	
15	Hereford United	46	14	16	16	66	72	−6	58	
16	Burnley	46	14	13	19	52	61	−9	55	
17	Peterborough United	46	14	12	20	52	74	−22	54	
18	Rochdale	46	13	14	19	56	82	−26	53	
19	Hartlepool United	46	14	10	22	50	78	−28	52	
20	Stockport County	46	10	21	15	54	52	+2	51	
21	Halifax Town	46	13	11	22	69	75	−6	50	
22	Colchester United	46	12	14	20	60	78	−18	50	
23	Doncaster Rovers	46	13	10	23	49	78	−29	49	
24	Darlington (R)	46	8	18	20	53	76	−23	42	Relegation to the Football Conference

(C) Champions; (O) Play-off winners; (P) Promoted; (R) Relegated

==== Fourth Division playoffs ====
Semi-finals; 1st leg –21 May; 2nd leg –24 May 1989
4th	Scunthorpe United	1	0	1
7th	Wrexham	3	2	5
5th	Scarborough	1	0	1
6th	Leyton Orient	0	2	2

Finals; 1st leg –30 May; 2nd leg –3 June 1989
7th	Wrexham	0	1	1
6th	Leyton Orient	0	2	2

=== Top goalscorers ===
First Division

- Alan Smith (Arsenal) – 22 goals

Second Division

- Keith Edwards (Hull City) – 26 goals

Third Division

- Steve Bull (Wolverhampton Wanderers) – 37 goals

Fourth Division

- Phil Stant (Hereford United) – 28 goals

== Non-league football ==
In their first season after relegation from the Football League, Newport County went out of business on 27 February. They were then expelled from the Conference for failing to fulfil their fixtures, but reformed three months later.

The divisional champions of the major non-League competitions were:

Competition	Winners
Football Conference	Maidstone United
Isthmian League	Leytonstone/Ilford
Northern Premier League	Barrow
Southern League	Merthyr Tydfil
FA Trophy	Telford United
FA Vase	Tamworth

== Star players ==
Manchester United striker Mark Hughes, who had returned to the club after two unhappy seasons with Barcelona in Spain and Bayern Munich in Germany was voted PFA Players' Player of the Year. The PFA Young Player of the Year award went to Arsenal's winger Paul Merson, who helped his side win their first league title for 18 years.

FWA Footballer of the Year was Liverpool captain Steve Nicol, while a special award was credited to the Liverpool players for their compassion shown to families bereaved by the Hillsborough disaster.

In the Third Division, 24-year-old Wolves striker Steve Bull scored 53 goals in all competitions and made a scoring debut for the England national football team.

== Star managers ==
- George Graham's three years of rebuilding Arsenal paid off as he ended their 18-year title drought with the last goal of the season. He received the Manager of the Year award for his efforts.
- Kenny Dalglish compensated for Liverpool's title disappointment with victory over neighbours Everton in the FA Cup final.
- Brian Clough guided Nottingham Forest to a hard-earned League Cup triumph and also victory in the Full Members Cup after they had gone nine years without a trophy.
- Dave Stringer pulled off one of the shocks of the season by taking unfancied Norwich City to fourth place in the First Division.
- Steve Coppell's five years of outstanding effort at Crystal Palace paid off as he got them promoted to the First Division as playoff winners.
- Graham Turner's rejuvenated Wolves side reached the Second Division with a second successive championship and promotion triumph.
- Dave Bassett celebrated his first full season as Sheffield United manager by winning promotion to the Second Division.
- John Rudge took Port Vale to their highest point in decades by guiding them to success in the Third Division promotion playoffs.
- Dario Gradi took Crewe Alexandra to third place in the Fourth Division and earned them promotion after years in the league's lowest division.
- Frank Clark inspired a late run of excellent form for his Leyton Orient side who won promotion to the Third Division as Fourth Division playoff winners.

== Famous debutants ==
24 September 1988: Russell Beardsmore, 19-year-old midfielder, makes his debut for Manchester United in their First Division 2–0 home win over West Ham United.

15 October 1988: Ian Olney, 18-year-old winger, makes his debut for Aston Villa in their 2–2 draw with Charlton Athletic at Selhurst Park.

22 October 1988: Mark Robins, 18-year-old striker, makes his debut for Manchester United as a substitute in their First Division 1–1 draw with Wimbledon at Plough Lane.

26 October 1988: Mark Crossley, 19-year-old goalkeeper, makes his debut for Nottingham Forest in 2–1 home win over Liverpool in First Division at the City Ground.

6 November 1988: Gary Charles, 18-year-old defender, makes his debut for Nottingham Forest in their 4–1 home defeat by Arsenal in the First Division at the City Ground.

10 December 1988: Scott Minto, 17-year-old defender, makes his debut for Charlton Athletic in their 1–1 draw with Q.P.R. in the First Division at Selhurst Park

4 February 1989: John Ebbrell, 19-year-old midfielder, makes his debut for Everton in their First Division 1–1 draw with Wimbledon at Plough Lane.

1 April 1989: David May, 18-year-old defender, makes his debut for Blackburn Rovers in a 1–1 Second Division draw with fellow promotion rivals Swindon Town at the County Ground.

6 May 1989: Gary Speed, 19-year-old Welsh midfielder, makes his debut for Leeds United in 0–0 Second Division draw with Oldham Athletic at Elland Road.

13 May 1989: Steve Howey, 17-year-old defender, makes his debut as a substitute for relegated Newcastle United on the final day of the First Division season, when they lose 2–0 to Manchester United at Old Trafford. Graeme Le Saux, 20-year-old Jersey born defender, makes his debut for Second Division champions Chelsea in 3–2 win against Portsmouth at Fratton Park.

== Retirements ==
- May 1989: Andy Gray, 33-year-old Rangers and Scotland striker who spent most his career in England. Retired from professional football but returned to England to play non-league football with Cheltenham Town.
- June 1989: Arnold Muhren, 38-year-old Dutch winger who played in England for Ipswich Town and Manchester United before returning to the Netherlands in 1985 to complete his playing career.
- June 1989: Remi Moses, 28-year-old Manchester United midfielder who had been out of action for more than a year due to ongoing injury problems.

== Deaths ==
- 24 July 1988 – John Harris, 71, born in Glasgow, was Chelsea's centre-half in their league championship winning side of 1955. Later managed Sheffield United and took them into the First Division in 1971.
- 1 August 1988 – Steve Mills, 34, who died after a two-year battle against leukaemia, starting his playing career with Notts County and later playing for Southampton. His career was ended by injury at the age of 23.
- 3 August 1988 – Vic Watson, 90, was West Ham United's all-time leading goalscorer with 326 goals between 1920 and 1935.
- 21 August 1988 – Stuart Leary, 55, played a total of nearly 500 competitive games for Charlton Athletic and Queens Park Rangers and was also a cricketer for Kent between 1951 and 1971.
- 16 September 1988 – Dick Pym, 95, kept goal more than 300 times for Bolton Wanderers between 1921 and 1931 as well as three times for the England team. He collected three FA Cup winner's medals with Bolton and was the last surviving member of the team which won the first FA Cup final at Wembley in 1923.
- 7 October 1988 – George Ansell, 78, was a forward for Brighton, Norwich City and Southampton during the interwar years.
- 9 October 1988 – Jackie Milburn, 64, legendary goalscorer for Newcastle United and England during the 1950s. Was a cousin of England World Cup winners Bobby and Jack Charlton. Died of cancer.
- 11 January 1989 – Len Dunderdale, 73, was a centre forward for clubs including Sheffield Wednesday, Walsall, Watford and Leeds United during the 1930s and 1940s.
- 13 January 1989 – Stan Cribb, 83, played 125 league games during the interwar years for Southampton, QPR and Cardiff City.
- 1 April 1989 – George Robledo, 62, Chilean born striker, formerly of Newcastle United, died of a heart attack. He played for Chile at the 1950 World Cup and won the FA Cup with Newcastle in both of the two seasons that followed the World Cup. In the second final, he was playing in the same team as his brother Ted Robledo.
- 2 April 1989 – Les Bruton, 86, played for clubs including Southampton, Blackburn Rovers and Liverpool during the interwar years.
- 15 April 1989 – The 94 Liverpool supporters who died in Hillsborough disaster, on the day of the tragedy at the FA Cup semi-final either at the stadium, on their journey to hospital, or shortly after arrival. These included the tragedy's youngest victim, 10-year-old Jon-Paul Gilhooley, and the oldest victim, 67-year-old Gerard Baron, whose late brother Kevin had played for Liverpool in the 1950 FA Cup Final.
- 18 April 1989 – Lee Nicol, 14, the 95th victim of the Hillsborough disaster, died in hospital from his injuries having never regained consciousness.
- 26 May 1989 – Don Revie, 61, manager of the great Leeds United side of the late 1960s and early 1970s who were league champions twice, FA Cup winners once, League Cup winners once and European Fairs Cup winners twice and Charity Shield Winners once. Managed England from 1974 to 1977 but walked out on them to gain a lucrative four-year deal as national coach of the United Arab Emirates. Returned to his homeland in 1985, four years before his death from motor neurone disease.
- 7 June 1989 – George Roughton, 80, played at centre-half for Huddersfield Town and Manchester United in the decade preceding the outbreak of World War II, and was Exeter City's first postwar manager, later taking charge of Southampton.

== Transfers ==
Tottenham midfielder Chris Waddle was sold to Olympique Marseille of France in a £4.25 million deal, in the latest of big money deals which saw players desert English clubs for foreign clubs who were prepared to pay higher wages. Gary Lineker ended his three-year spell at FC Barcelona to join Tottenham. He had played under Tottenham manager Terry Venables during his first season at Barcelona.

Lineker's strike partner Mark Hughes also left Barcelona and returned to his old club Manchester United in a £1.8 million deal. Hughes had been a disappointment in his first season at Barcelona but had recaptured his form during a successful season-long loan deal at Bayern Munich.
