= Terry Wallis =

Survivor of 19-year-long coma

- Born: Terry Wayne Wallis; April 7, 1964; Marianna, Arkansas, U.S.
- Died: March 29, 2022 (aged 57); Searcy, Arkansas, U.S.
- Known for: Being in a minimally conscious state for 19 years due to injuries suffered in an accident
- Spouse: Sandi Wallis (1980s)
- Children: 1

Terry Wayne Wallis (April 7, 1964 – March 29, 2022) was an American man from the Ozark Mountains of Arkansas who, on June 11, 2003, regained awareness after spending 19 years in a minimally conscious state.

== Early life ==
Wallis was born on April 7, 1964, in Marianna, Arkansas, to Angilee and Jerry Wallis. Six weeks before his accident, Wallis became a father when his wife Sandi gave birth to a daughter.

== Accident ==
On July 13, 1984, Wallis was driving his pickup truck with two passengers when it smashed into a railing fence on a small bridge near Stone County, Arkansas, and skidded over the edge. The truck was found upside down in the dry riverbed 25 feet (7.6 m) below. The accident killed one of the two passengers. Aged 20, Wallis was found unresponsive but breathing, with significant injuries. He remained comatose and tetraplegic and was moved to a Mountain View nursing home.

Within a year of the accident, the coma stabilized into a minimally conscious state, but doctors believed his condition to be permanent.

== Awakening ==
In 2003, Wallis spontaneously awoke and began talking. When a nurse asked him who the woman walking toward him was, he identified her as "mama". He believed that he was still 20 and that it was still 1984. His muscles remained weak but he gradually experienced limited recovery over a three-day "awakening period" in which he regained the ability to control some parts of his body and to speak to others. However, he remained disabled, including the motor speech disorder dysarthria.

"His mother and all of his family cared for him relentlessly during his coma and afterwards," according to his obituary. "His family would bring him home on alternate weekends for years. Doctors believe that this stimulation contributed to his awakening period."

Wallis was the subject of the BodyShock special for 2005 "The Man Who Slept for 19 Years" made for Channel 4 in the UK. It showed his mother and daughter encouraging him to talk to neurologists to try to find out how he had regained speech after such a long time. The program featured several prominent physicians, including Caroline McCagg, the medical director of the JFK Center for head injury in New Jersey; Joe Giacino, a neuropsychologist who said that Wallis' brain retained a lot of information from before 1984 but little after 1984 because he had lost the ability to store new memories, a condition known as anterograde amnesia; and Martin Gizzi, a neurologist who showed that damage to the frontal lobes made Wallis unable to process experiences into memories. Also featured in the program was the neuropsychologist Roger Llewellyn Wood.

Using new technology, brain scans were done on Wallis by Nicholas Schiff of Weill Cornell Medical College. The hypothesis built from the imaging studies is that Wallis' brain reconnected neurons that remained intact and formed new connections to circumvent damaged areas.

== Death ==
In January 2022, Wallis developed pneumonia and was placed on a ventilator at the request of his family, against medical advice due to concerns regarding his quality of life. In order to regain lung function, Wallis needed pulmonary therapy, but the nearest facility equipped to treat his condition was out of state, and he was too weak to handle the ambulance ride.

Wallis was transferred to an advanced care facility in Searcy, Arkansas, to receive pulmonary support until he was well enough to travel. Despite their best efforts, Wallis died at the facility on March 29, 2022, at the age of 57, due to pulmonary complications.

== See also ==
- List of people who awoke from a coma
- Persistent vegetative state
