= Donald Herbert =

Donald Herbert may refer to:

- Don Herbert, American host of educational television shows
- Donald Herbert (firefighter), American firefighter who awoke from a coma after more than nine years
