= Donald Herbert (firefighter) =

American firefighter and coma patient (1961–2006)

- Born: Donald J. Herbert; May 7, 1961; Buffalo, New York, U.S.
- Died: February 21, 2006 (aged 44); Buffalo, New York, U.S.
- Resting place: Holy Cross Cemetery, Lackawanna, New York, U.S.
- Occupation: Firefighter
- Known for: Awakening after over nine years in a minimally conscious state
- Spouse: Linda Blake
- Children: 4

Donald J. Herbert (May 7, 1961 – February 21, 2006) was an American firefighter from Buffalo, New York who awoke from a minimally conscious state after more than 9 years.

== Early life ==
Herbert was born on May 7, 1961 in Buffalo, New York.

== Career and coma ==
Donald Herbert joined the Buffalo Fire Department in 1986. On the morning of December 29, 1995, the roof of a building in which he was fighting a fire collapsed, pinning him down and starving his brain of oxygen for over six minutes. He was rescued from the collapsed structure, but suffered cardiac arrest and was taken to a hospital where he lapsed into a coma.

A year later, he regained consciousness for the first time but had speech and vision problems and could not eat or walk without help. Herbert could barely remember anything and he had no longer recognized his relatives and friends. In 1999, Herbert's wife Linda prevailed in a brief legal battle with his parents, Geraldine and Donald P. Herbert, over who would have control over decisions in the event of a medical emergency. He remained in a minimally conscious state for over nine years until, on April 30, 2005, he awoke and asked where his wife was. He was then able to speak to his friends and family for over 14 continuous hours. He had four children, who at the time of the accident were aged 14, 13, 11 and 3, and with whom he was able to speak for the first time in almost a decade. He asked how old he was, and how long he had been gone, expressing surprise when he learned that he had been unresponsive for almost ten years. His breakthrough came after he had been given a new cocktail of drugs normally used to treat Parkinson's, ADHD and depression.

Although virtually blinded by the accident and wheelchair-using due to muscular atrophy, he was able to play catch with his sons. However, he was never able to return to the level of communication as the day he woke up and spoke only sporadically from then on.

== Death and legacy ==
He had numerous infections over the next several months and eventually died on February 21, 2006, as a result of pneumonia. Herbert is buried at Holy Cross Cemetery in Lackawanna, New York.

During his time as a firefighter he received several medals and awards for his service, and is included on the National Fallen Firefighters Memorial in Emmitsburg, Maryland. Of Herbert's four sons, two were firefighters and two were police officers. A relative of the Herbert family, Rich Blake, wrote a book about the event titled The Day Donny Herbert Woke Up. His son, Patrick Herbert, also followed his father's firefighting career path and was promoted to lieutenant in 2018.

== See also ==
- List of people who awoke from a coma
