= Forever Love (1998 film) =

- DVD release
- Written by: Joyce Heft Brotman
- Directed by: Michael Switzer
- Starring: Reba McEntire; Bess Armstrong; Tim Matheson; Scott Foley
- Theme music composer: Michael Tavera
- Country of origin: United States
- Original language: English

Production
- Producer: William Shippey
- Editor: Mark W. Rosenbaum
- Running time: 120 minutes

Original release
- Network: CBS
- Release: September 27, 1998

Forever Love is a 1998 television film, partially based on Annie Shapiro's awakening, starring Reba McEntire and Bess Armstrong.

== Plot ==
Lizzie (Reba McEntire) and Alex Brooks (Tim Matheson) are a fairy tale young couple, wildly in love and the parents of a little girl named Emma. Without warning, Lizzie suffers a stroke at the age of twenty-four. Alex is informed by the hospital doctors that Lizzie has slipped into a deep coma and there is nothing to do but wait to see if she comes out of it. Determined to keep his vow to love Lizzie in sickness and in health, Alex decides to bring her home to care for her. Gail, Lizzie's best friend, helps and consoles Alex. However, Gail's help extends further when she aids in raising Emma as well. When Gail's husband is killed in a car crash, Alex, Gail and Emma form a practical family unit of their own.

Twenty years after her stroke, Lizzie wakes up. Miraculously, she is pronounced perfectly healthy and begins to try to assimilate back into a world that has radically changed. Emma, who is about to be married, is thrilled to have her mother back, as are Alex and Gail. But, Lizzie's presence is also confusing for all of them as she attempts to move back into the place she rightfully occupies in their lives.

== Cast ==
- Reba McEntire as Lizzie Brooks
- Tim Matheson as Alex Brooks
- Bess Armstrong as Gail
- Heather Stephens as Emma
- Scott Foley as David
- Gary Hershberger as Chuck
- Richard Biggs as Dr. Berris

== Music ==
Scenes from the movie are featured in Reba's music video of the song, "Forever Love".
