= Minimally conscious state =

Disorder of consciousness

- Brain scans of various disorders of consciousness, including minimally conscious state
- Specialty: Neurology

A minimally conscious state (MCS) is a disorder of consciousness distinct from persistent vegetative state (PVS) and locked-in syndrome. Unlike PVS, patients with MCS have partial preservation of conscious awareness. MCS is a relatively new category of disorders of consciousness. The natural history and longer-term outcome of MCS have not yet been thoroughly studied. The prevalence of MCS was estimated to be nine times of PVS cases (adult and pediatric), or between 112,000 and 280,000 in the US by year 2000.

== Pathophysiology ==
=== Neuroimaging ===
Because minimally conscious state is a relatively new criterion for diagnosis, there are very few functional imaging studies of patients with this condition. Preliminary data has shown that overall cerebral metabolism is less than in those with conscious awareness (20–40% of normal) and is slightly higher but comparable to those in vegetative states. Activation in the medial parietal cortex and adjacent posterior cingulate cortex are brain regions that seem to differ between patients in MCS and those from vegetative states. These areas are most active during periods of conscious waking and are least active when in altered states of consciousness, such as general anesthesia, propofol, hypnotic state, dementia, and Wernicke–Korsakoff syndrome. Auditory stimulation induced more widespread activation in the primary and pre-frontal associative areas of MCS patients than vegetative state patients. There were also more cortiocortical functional connectivity between the auditory cortex and a large network of temporal and prefrontal cortices in MCS than vegetative states. These findings encourage treatments based on neuromodulatory and cognitive revalidation therapeutic strategies for patients with MCS.

Resting overall cerebral metabolism of various brain states

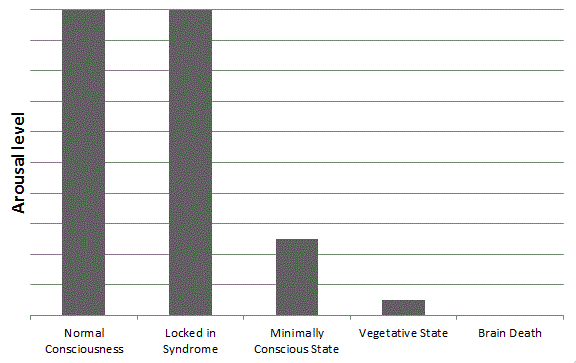
Arousal levels of various brain states

One study used diffusion tensor imaging (DTI) in two case studies. They found that there were widespread cerebral atrophy in both patients. The lateral ventricles were increased in size, and the corpus callosum and the periventricular white matter were diminished. The DTI maps showed that there was significant reduction of volume in the medial corpus callosum and other parts of the brain compared to normal subjects. They also found markedly lower diffusion values in white matter and increased cerebral spinal fluid compartments. Cortical injuries at this level provides a particular favorable environment for sprouting of new axons to occur in the intact areas of the cortex, which may explain some of the greater recovery rates in minimally conscious state patients. The axonal regrowth has been correlated with functional motor recovery. The regrowth and rerouting of the axons may explain some of the changes to brain structure. These findings support the efforts to prospectively and longitudinally characterize neuroplasticity in both brain structure and function following severe injuries. Utilizing DTI and other neuroimaging techniques may further shed light on the debates on long-distance cortical rewiring and may lead to better rehabilitation strategies.

Some areas of the brain that are correlated with the subjective experience of pain were activated in MCS patients when noxious stimulation was present. Positron emission tomography (PET) scans found increased blood flow to the secondary sensory cortex, posterior parietal cortex, premotor cortex, and the superior temporal cortex. The pattern of activation, however, was with less spatial extent. Some parts of the brain were less activated than normal patients during noxious stimulus processing. These were the posterior cingulate, medial prefrontal cortex, and the occipital cortex. Even though functional brain imaging can objectively measure changes in brain function during noxious stimulation, the role of different areas of the brain in pain processing is only partially understood. Furthermore, there is still the problem of the subjective experience. MCS patients by definition cannot consistently and reliably communicate their experiences. Even if they were able to answer the question "are you in pain?", there would not be a reliable response. Further clinical trials are needed to access the appropriateness of the use of analgesia in patients with MCS.

=== Residual language function ===
A functional magnetic resonance imaging (fMRI) study found that minimally conscious state patients showed activation in auditory networks when they heard narratives with personally meaningful content to them, by a familiar voice. These activations were not seen when the narratives were read backwards.

Another study compared patients in vegetative state and minimally conscious state in their ability to recognize language. They found that some patients in minimally conscious state demonstrated some evidence of preserved speech processing. There was more activation in response to sentences compared to white noise.

== Diagnosis ==
=== Medical definition ===
Minimally conscious state (MCS) is defined as a condition of severely altered consciousness in which minimal but definite behavioral evidence of self or environmental awareness is demonstrated.

=== Diagnosis ===
Although MCS patients are able to demonstrate cognitively mediated behaviors, they occur inconsistently. They are, however, reproducible or can be sustained long enough to be differentiated from reflexive behavior. Because of this inconsistency, extended assessment may be required to determine if a simple response (e.g. a finger movement or a blink) occurred because of a specific environmental event (e.g. a command to move the finger or to blink) or was merely a coincidental behavior. Distinguishing between VS and MCS is often difficult because the diagnosis is dependent on observation of behavior that show self or environmental awareness and because those behavioral responses are markedly reduced. One of the more common diagnostic errors involving disorders of consciousness is mistaking MCS for VS which may lead to serious repercussions related to clinical management.

Giacino et al. have suggested demonstration of the following behaviors in order to make the diagnosis of MCS.

- Following simple commands such as following movements with their eyes or moving a finger when asked.
- Gestural or verbal yes/no responses (regardless of accuracy).
- Intelligible verbalization.
- Purposeful behavior such as those that are contingent due to appropriate environmental stimuli and are not reflexive. Some examples of purposeful behavior include:
  - appropriate smiling or crying in response to the linguistic or visual content of emotional but not to neutral topics or stimuli.
  - vocalizations or gestures that occur in direct response to the linguistic content of questions.
  - reaching for objects that demonstrates a clear relationship between object location and direction of reach.
  - touching or holding objects in a manner that accommodates the size and shape of the object.
  - pursuit eye movement or sustained fixation that occurs in direct response to moving or salient stimuli.

== Treatment ==
There is currently no definitive evidence that support altering the course of the recovery of minimally conscious state. There are currently multiple clinical trials underway investigating potential treatments. In one case study, stimulation of thalamus using deep brain stimulation (DBS) led to some behavioral improvements. The patient was a 38-year-old male who had remained in minimally conscious state following a severe traumatic brain injury. He had been unresponsive to consistent command following or communication ability and had remained non-verbal over two years in inpatient rehabilitation. fMRI scans showed preservation of a large-scale, bi-hemispheric cerebral language network, which indicates that possibility for further recovery may exist. Positron emission tomography showed that the patient's global cerebral metabolism levels were markedly reduced. He had DBS electrodes implanted bilaterally within his central thalamus. More specifically, the DBS electrodes targeted the anterior intralaminar nuclei of thalamus and adjacent paralaminar regions of thalamic association nuclei. Both electrodes were positioned within the central lateral nucleus, the paralaminar regions of the median dorsalis, and the posterior-medial aspect of the centromedian/parafasicularis nucleus complex. This allowed maximum coverage of the thalamic bodies. A DBS stimulation was conducted such that the patient was exposed to various patterns of stimulation to help identify optimal behavioral responses. Approximately 140 days after the stimulation began, qualitative changes in behavior emerged. There were longer periods of eye opening and increased responses to command stimuli as well as higher scores on the JFK coma recovery scale (CRS). Functional object use and intelligible verbalization was also observed. The observed improvements in arousal level, motor control, and consistency of behavior could be a result of direct activation of frontal cortical and basal ganglia systems that were innervated by neurons within the thalamic association nuclei. These neurons act as a key communication relay and form a pathway between the brainstem arousal systems and frontal lobe regions. This pathway is crucial for many executive functions such as working memory, effort regulation, selective attention, and focus.

In another case study of a 50-year-old woman who had symptoms consistent with MCS, administration of zolpidem, a sedative hypnotic drug improved the patient's condition significantly. Without treatment, the patient showed signs of mutism, athetoid movements of the extremities, and complete dependence for all personal care. Forty-five minutes after 5 to 10 mg of zolpidem was administered, the patient ceased the athetoid movements, regained speaking ability, and was able to self-feed. The effect lasted 3–4 hours, from which she returned to the former state. The effects were repeated on a daily basis. PET scans showed that after zolpidem was administered, there was a marked increase in blood flow to areas of the brain adjacent to or distant from damaged tissues. In this case, these areas were the ipsilateral cerebral hemispheres and the cerebellum. These areas are thought to have been inhibited by the site of injury through a GABA-mediated mechanism and the inhibition was modified by zolpidem, which is a GABA agonist. The fact that zolpidem is a sedative drug that induces sleep in normal people but causes arousal in a MCS patient is paradoxical. The mechanisms to why this effect occurs is not entirely clear.

There is evidence that transcranial direct current stimulation (tDCS), a technique that supplies a small electric current in the brain with non-invasive electrodes, may improve the clinical state of patients with MCS. In one study with 10 patients with disorders of consciousness (7 in VS, 3 in MCS), tDCS was applied for 20 minutes every day for 10 days, and showed clinical improvement in all three patients who were in MCS, but not in those with VS. These results remained at 12-month follow-up. Two of the patients in MCS that had their brain insult less than 12 months recovered consciousness in the following months. One of these patients received a second round of tDCS treatment four months after his initial treatment, and showed further recovery and emerged into consciousness, with no change of clinical status between the two treatments.

== Prognosis ==
One of the defining characteristics of minimally conscious state is the more continuous improvement and significantly more favorable outcomes post-injury when compared with vegetative state. One study looked at 100 patients with severe brain injury. At the beginning of the study, all the patients were unable to follow commands consistently or communicate reliably. These patients were diagnosed with either MCS or vegetative state based on performance on the JFK Coma Recovery Scale and the diagnostic criteria for MCS as recommended by the Aspen Consensus Conference Work-group. Both patient groups were further separated into those that had traumatic brain injury and those that had non-traumatic brain injures (anoxia, tumor, hydrocephalus, infection). The patients were assessed multiple times over a period of 12 months post-injury using the Disability Rating Scale (DRS), which ranges from a score of 30 (dead) to 0 (no disabilities). The results show that the DRS scores for the MCS subgroups showed the most improvement and predicted the most favorable outcomes 12 months post-injury. Among those diagnosed with MCS, DRS scores were significantly lower for those with non-traumatic brain injuries in comparison to the vegetative state patients with traumatic brain injury. DRS scores were also significantly lower for the MCS non-traumatic brain injury group compared to the MCS traumatic brain injury group. Pairwise comparisons showed that DRS scores were significantly higher for those that suffered from non-traumatic brain injuries than those with traumatic brain injuries. For the patients in vegetative states there were no significant differences between patients with non-traumatic brain injury and those with traumatic brain injuries. Out of the 100 patients studied, three patients fully recovered (had a DRS score of 0). These three patients were diagnosed with MCS and had suffered from traumatic brain injuries.

In summary, those with minimally conscious state and non-traumatic brain injuries will not progress as well as those with traumatic brain injuries while those in vegetative states have an all around lower to minimal chance of recovery.

Because of the major differences in prognosis described in this study, this makes it crucial that MCS be diagnosed correctly. Incorrectly diagnosing MCS as vegetative state may lead to serious repercussions related to clinical management.

== History ==
Prior to the mid-1990s, there was a lack of operational definitions available to clinicians and researchers to guide the differential diagnosis among disorders of consciousness. As a result, patients were lumped together into broad categories often based on the severity of the disability (e.g. moderate, severe, extremely severe). These diagnoses were performed without regard to salient differences in behavioral and pathological characteristics. In a three-year period spanning from 1994 to 1996, three position statements regarding the diagnostic criteria of disorder of consciousness were published. The "Medical Aspects of the Persistent Vegetative State" was published by the American Academy of Neurology (AAN) in 1994. In 1995, "Recommendations for Use of Uniform Nomenclature Pertinent to Patients With Severe Alterations in Consciousness" was published by the American Congress of Rehabilitation Medicine (ACRM). In 1996 the "International Working Party on the Management of the Vegetative State: Summary Report" was published by a group of international delegates from neurology, rehabilitation, neurosurgery, and neuropsychology. However, because the diagnostic criteria were published independently from one another, the final recommendations differed greatly from one another. The Aspen Neurobehavioral Work-group was convened to explore the underlying causes of these disparities. In the end, the Aspen Work-group provided a consensus statement regarding definitions and diagnostic criteria disorder of consciousness which include the vegetative state (VS) and the minimally conscious state (MCS).

== Ethical issues ==
One of the major ethical concerns involving patients with severe brain damage is their inability to communicate. By definition, patients who are unconscious or are minimally conscious are incapable of giving informed consent, which is required for participation in clinical research. Typically, written approval is obtained from family members or legal representatives. The inability to receive informed consent has led to much research being refused grants, ethics committee approval, or research publication. This puts patients in these conditions at risk of being denied therapy that may be life-saving.

=== The right to die ===
The right to die in patients with severe cognitive impairment has developed over time because of their grave neurological state and the perceived futility of continued treatment. Such cases have been debated vigorously in the past, as in the case with Terri Schiavo, who was diagnosed with persistent vegetative state. In the case of minimally conscious state patients, they are neither permanently unconscious nor are they necessarily hopelessly damaged. Thus, these patients warrant additional evaluation. On one hand, some argue that entertaining the possibility of intervention in some patients may erode the "right to die" moral obligation. Conversely, there is also fear that people may associate attitudes with higher-functioning people in minimally conscious state with people in persistent vegetative state, thus minimizing the value of their lives.

=== Regulating therapeutic nihilism ===
Currently, risk aversion dominates the ethical landscape when research involves those with impaired decision-making abilities. Fears of therapeutic adventurism has led to a disproportionate view about the under-appreciation of potential benefits and an overstatement of risks. Thus, recognizing this distortion is important in order to calculate the right balance between protecting vulnerable populations that cannot provide autonomous consent and potentially restorative clinical trials.

== Notable examples ==
- Jackie Wilson (June 9, 1934 – January 21, 1984), American soul and rock-and-roll singer who fell into a coma after collapsing on stage in 1975, soon recovered consciousness but then quickly regressed to a minimally conscious state for the rest of his life.
- Jan Grzebski (1942–2008), a Polish railroad worker who fell into a minimally conscious state in 1988 and woke up four years later, but did not fully recover until 2007.
- Chi Cheng (1970–2013), an American musician, best known as the original bassist for the band Deftones, who was involved in a serious automobile accident in 2008 that left him in a minimally conscious state for the rest of his life.
- Terry Wallis (1964–2022), an American man who fell into coma for nearly a year after a truck accident, then into minimally conscious state for 19 years.
- Martin Pistorius (born 1975), a South African man who, because of a mystery illness, spent three years in a vegetative state, four years in a minimally conscious state, and five years unable to move anything other than his eyes (locked-in syndrome). In 1999, he fully awakened, and has since recovered to the point that he was able to become a web designer, developer, and author. In 2011, he wrote a book called Ghost Boy, in which he describes his many years of being comatose.
