= Disorder of consciousness =

Disorders of consciousness
- Specialty: Neurology, psychiatry

Disorders of consciousness are medical conditions that inhibit consciousness. Some define disorders of consciousness as any change from complete self-awareness to inhibited or absent self-awareness and arousal. This category generally includes minimally conscious state and persistent vegetative state, but sometimes also includes the less severe locked-in syndrome and more severe but rare chronic coma. Differential diagnosis of these disorders is an active area of biomedical research. Finally, brain death results in an irreversible disruption of consciousness. While other conditions may cause a moderate deterioration (e.g., dementia and delirium) or transient interruption (e.g., grand mal and petit mal seizures) of consciousness, they are not included in this category.

== Classification ==
Patients in such a dramatically altered state of consciousness present unique problems for diagnosis, prognosis and treatment. Assessment of cognitive functions remaining after a traumatic brain injury is difficult. Voluntary movements may be very small, inconsistent and easily exhausted. Quantification of brain activity differentiates patients who sometimes only differ by a brief and small movement of a finger.

Consciousness is a complex and multifaceted concept, divided into two main components: Arousal and Awareness. Arousal is associated with functional brainstem neuron populations projecting to both thalamic and cortical neurons. Therefore, the assessment of reflexes (Using the Glasgow Coma Scale) is important to investigate the functional integrity of the brainstem. Awareness is thought to be related with functional integrity of the cerebral cortex and its subcortical connections. The most important point regarding the classification of disorders of consciousness is, that consciousness cannot be measured objectively by any machine, although many scoring systems have been developed for the quantification of consciousness and neuroimaging techniques are important tools for clinical research, extending our understanding of underlying mechanisms involved. Disorders in consciousness represent immense social and ethical issues because the diagnosis is methodologically complex and needs careful interpretation. Also the ethical framework must be further developed to guide research in these patients.

=== Locked-in syndrome ===
In locked-in syndrome the patient has awareness, sleep-wake cycles, and meaningful behavior (viz., eye-movement), but is isolated due to quadriplegia and pseudobulbar palsy, resulting from the disruption of corticospinal and corticobulbar pathways. Locked-in syndrome is a condition in which a patient is aware and awake but cannot move or communicate verbally due to complete paralysis of nearly all voluntary muscles in the body except for the eyes. Eye or eyelid movements are the main method of communication. Total locked-in syndrome is a version of locked-in syndrome where the eyes are paralyzed as well.

=== Minimally conscious state ===
In a minimally conscious state, the patient has intermittent periods of awareness and wakefulness. The criteria for minimally conscious state, that patients are not in a vegetative state but are not able to communicate consistently. This means, that patients have to show limited but reproducible signs of awareness of themself or their environment. This could be following of simple commands, intelligible speech or purposeful behavior (including movements or affective behavior in relation to external stimuli, but not reflexive activity). Further improvement towards full conscious recovery is more likely in this state than in the vegetative state, but still some patients remain in the MCS constantly.

=== Persistent vegetative state ===
In a persistent vegetative state, the patient has sleep-wake cycles, but lacks awareness, is not able to communicate and only displays reflexive and non-purposeful behavior. The term refers to an organic body that is able to grow and develop devoid of intellectual activity or social intercourse. The diagnosis of the vegetative state should be questioned when there is any degree of sustained and reproducible visual pursuit or fixation or response to threatening gestures. This state reflects an intact brainstem and allied structures but severely damaged white and gray matter in both cerebral hemispheres. The preservation of these structures maintains arousal and automatic functions. The overall metabolism drops in average to 40-50% of the normal range. After four weeks in a vegetative state (VS), the patient is classified as in a persistent vegetative state. Here the metabolism drops to 30-40% of the normal range but seems to be a result of trans-synaptic neuronal degeneration. Although the diagnosis is problematic, the formal absence of any sign of conscious perception or deliberate action is essential. This diagnosis can be further classified as a permanent vegetative state (PVS) after approximately 1 year of being in a vegetative state after traumatic brain injury.

=== Chronic coma ===
Like coma, chronic coma results mostly from cortical or white-matter damage after neuronal or axonal injury, or from focal brainstem lesions. Usually the metabolism in the grey matter decreases to 50-70% of the normal range. The patient lacks awareness and arousal. The patient lies with eyes closed and is not aware of self or surroundings. Stimulation cannot produce spontaneous periods of wakefulness and eye-opening, unlike patients in vegetative state. In medicine, a coma (from the Greek κῶμα koma, meaning deep sleep) is a state of unconsciousness, lasting more than six hours in which a person cannot be awakened, fails to respond normally to painful stimuli, light, sound, lacks a normal sleep-wake cycle and does not initiate voluntary actions. Although, according to the Glasgow Coma Scale, a person with confusion is considered to be in the mildest coma. But cerebral metabolism has been shown to correlate poorly with the level of consciousness in patients with mild to severe injury within the first month after traumatic brain injury (TBI). A person in a state of coma is described as comatose. In general patients surviving a coma recover gradually within 2–4 weeks. But recovery to full awareness and arousal is not always possible. Some patients do not progress further than vegetative state or minimally conscious state and sometimes this also results in prolonged stages before further recovery to complete consciousness.

Although a coma patient may appear to be awake, they are unable to consciously feel, speak, hear, or move. For a patient to maintain consciousness, two important neurological components must function impeccably. The first is the cerebral cortex which is the gray matter covering the outer layer of the brain. The other is a structure located in the brainstem, called reticular activating system (RAS or ARAS). Injury to either or both of these components is sufficient to cause a patient to experience a coma.

=== Brain death ===
Brain death is the irreversible end of all brain activity, and function (including involuntary activity necessary to sustain life). The main cause is total necrosis of the cerebral neurons following loss of brain oxygenation. After brain death the patient lacks any sense of awareness; sleep-wake cycles or behavior, and typically look as if they are dead or are in a deep sleep-state or coma. Although visually similar to a comatose state such as persistent vegetative state, the two should not be confused. Criteria for brain death differ from country to country. However, the clinical assessments are the same and require the loss of all brainstem reflexes and the demonstration of continuing apnea in a persistently comatose patient (< 4 weeks). Functional imaging using PET or CT scans, typically show a hollow skull phenomenon. This confirms the absence of neuronal function in the whole brain. Patients classified as brain dead are legally dead and can qualify as organ donors, in which their organs are surgically removed and prepared for a particular recipient.

Brain death is one of the deciding factors when pronouncing a trauma patient as dead. Determining function and presence of necrosis after trauma to the whole brain or brain-stem may be used to determine brain death, and is used in many states in the US.

== Methodological problems ==
Metabolic studies are useful, but they are not able to identify neural activity within a specific region to specific cognitive processes. Functionality can only be identified at the most general level: Metabolism in cortical and subcortical regions that may contribute to cognitive processes.

At present, there is no established relation between cerebral metabolic rates of glucose or oxygen as measured by PET and patient outcome. The decrease of cerebral metabolism occurs also when patients are treated with anesthetics to the point of unresponsiveness. Lowest value (28% of normal range) have been reported during propofol anesthesia. Also, deep sleep represents a phase of decreased metabolism (down to 40% of the normal range) In general, quantitative PET studies and the assessment of cerebral metabolic rates depends on many assumptions. PET, for example, requires a correction factor, the lumped constant, which is stable in healthy brains. There are reports that a global decrease of this constant emerges after a traumatic brain injury. But, not only the correction factors change due to TBI. Another issue is the possibility of anaerobic glycolysis that could occur after TBI. In such a case, the glucose levels measured by the PET are not tightly connected to the oxygen consumption of the patient's brain. Third point regarding PET scans is the overall measurement per unit volume of brain tissue. The imaging can be affected by the inclusion of metabolically inactive spaces e.g. cerebrospinal fluid in the case of gross hydrocephalus, which artificially lowers the calculated metabolism. Also, the issue of radiation exposure must be considered in patients with already severely damaged brains and preclude longitudinal or follow-up studies.

== Ethical issues ==
Disorders of consciousness present a variety of ethical concerns. Most obvious is the lack of consent in any treatment decisions. Patients in PVS or MCS are not able to decide for the possibility of withdrawal of life-support. It is also a general question whether they should receive life-sustaining therapy and, if so, for what duration. The problems regarding a patient's consent also account for neuroimaging studies. Without patient's consent, such studies are perceived as unethical. Additionally, only few patients have created advance directives before losing decision-making capacity. Some studies demonstrated that some patients with disorders of consciousness may be aware despite clinical unresponsiveness. These findings could have a major impact on ethical and social issues.

== See also ==
- Neuropsychology
- Neuropsychological assessment
