= Oknö =

Coordinates: 57.0000°N 16.5000°E

- Location within Sweden
- Country: Sweden
- Time zone: CET

Oknö is an island outside Mönsterås, Sweden, and the name of the only town located on the island.

The "Sleeping Beauty of Oknö" Karolina Olsson was born and lived on the island.
