= Helga Wanglie =

American patient (1903–1991)

Helga M. Wanglie
- Born: October 20, 1903; Minneapolis, Minnesota
- Died: July 4, 1991 (aged 87); Minneapolis, Minnesota

Helga M. Wanglie (October 20, 1903 – July 4, 1991) was an elderly woman in a persistent vegetative state who became the object of a 1991 lawsuit over whether to continue life-sustaining care.

Wanglie suffered a fall on December 14, 1989, and subsequently developed respiratory problems and pneumonia. She became dependent on a medical ventilator. In May 1990, she suffered severe brain damage while hospitalized at Hennepin County Medical Center in Minneapolis, Minnesota. Her doctors concluded that it was not in her best interest to be kept alive. Her family wished to keep her on life support, and the hospital brought the matter to the Hennepin County Court for resolution.

Judge Patricia Belois decided in favor of the family by assigning Wanglie's husband, Oliver Wanglie, as her guardian. She died on July 4, 1991, from multiple organ failure, a few days after the court's decision.

Between December 1989 and May 1991, Wanglie's medical expenses totaled US$800,000, and were paid in full by Medicare and a supplemental insurer, Physician's Health Plan.
