= Gary Dockery =

American coma patient

Gary French Dockery (October 15, 1953 – April 15, 1997) was an American police officer in Walden, Tennessee. After being critically injured in 1988, he spent seven and a half years in a coma-like state. In 1996, he emerged from the coma and started talking enthusiastically, recognizing friends and recalling events from past years. He then fell back into a coma and died a year later.

== Biography ==
On September 17, 1988, Dockery was shot in the forehead by a drunken assailant as he responded to a domestic disturbance call. His shooter, Samuel Frank Downey, then aged 68, had made the call falsely reporting a disturbance and then shot Dockery at point blank range. He later told police that he had wanted revenge against the police for reprimanding him about noise following a noise complaint from his neighbors. Downey was sentenced to 37 years in prison. Dockery slipped into what doctors called a persistent vegetative state, unable to communicate except with occasional eye blinks and groans, indicating that part of his brain was still working. Although he could respond, he was not conscious.

On Monday, February 12, 1996, Dockery stirred and started talking, recognizing old friends, recalling the names of his horses, and recalling camping trips. He spoke less on Tuesday, and not at all the following day.

Four days after he began talking, Dockery underwent lung surgery due to a life-threatening infection. On April 15, 1997, he died at the age of 43 from a blood clot in his lung. Dockery was transported from his nursing home to Erlanger Hospital in Chattanooga, Tennessee, where he was pronounced dead at 9:52 a.m.

== See also ==
- List of people who awoke from a coma
