= Paul Brophy =

American firefighter (1937–1986)

- Born: April 27, 1937; Massachusetts, U.S.
- Died: October 23, 1986 (aged 49); Massachusetts, U.S.
- Occupation: Firefighter
- Known for: First American to be allowed to die by dehydration of his own volition

Paul Brophy (April 27, 1937 – October 23, 1986) was a firefighter in Massachusetts who entered a persistent vegetative state with no believed chance of recovery. Opposing viewpoints between his family and his doctors on how to deal with his condition sparked an early legal case on the right to die.

On March 22, 1983, Paul Brophy sustained a basilar artery aneurysm rupture with very destructive neurologic consequences. Following the rupture he entered a persistent vegetative state with no chance of recovery. As he was unable to chew or swallow, a gastric feeding tube was eventually inserted into him to allow for nutrition and hydration.

Later, when it became obvious that there was no hope for even a modest degree of higher brain function recovery, his family requested that his gastrostomy feedings be terminated, a request based on the fact that Brophy had verbally indicated that he would not want to exist in such a degraded state. However, the hospital, New England Sinai Hospital, denied the request, leading to a series of legal actions.

While the first court to hear the case agreed that Brophy would have wanted the gastrostomy tube removed, it refused to authorize its removal, principally because he was not terminally ill. However, when the case went on further to the Supreme Judicial Court of Massachusetts, transfer of Brophy to another hospital facility that was agreeable to removal of the gastrostomy tube was authorized.

Brophy died a number of days later, making him the first American to die after court-authorized discontinuation of artificially supplied nutrition and hydration to a person in a persistent vegetative state.

== Ethical concerns over death by dehydration ==
Judge Lynch of the Massachusetts Supreme Judicial Court argued that death by dehydration symptoms was "cruel and violent" in his opinion on this case because such a death involved:

- The mouth would dry out and become caked or coated with thick material.
- The lips would become parched and cracked.
- The tongue would swell, and might crack.
- The eyes would recede back into their orbits and the cheeks would become hollow.
- The lining of the nose might crack and cause the nose to bleed.
- The skin would hang loose on the body and become dry and scaly.
- The urine would become highly concentrated, leading to burning of the bladder.
- The lining of the stomach would dry out and the sufferer would experience dry heaves and vomiting.
- The body temperature would become very high.
- The brain cells would dry out, causing convulsions.
- The respiratory tract would dry out, and the thick secretions that would result could plug the lungs and cause death.
- At some point within five days to three weeks, the major organs, including the lungs, heart, and brain, would give out and the patient would die.

== See also ==
- Euthanasia
- Terri Schiavo
