= Jan Grzebski =

Polish coma patient

Jan Grzebski (1942 – 12 December 2008) was a Polish railroad worker who fell into a coma in 1988 after a workplace accident. His coma was falsely reported to have lasted 19 years. In reality his coma lasted 4 years but left him disabled and unable to speak. He managed to regain his ability speak 19 years after the accident.

== Biography ==
Grzebski was left in a coma after being hit by a train in 1988. He began to wake from his coma in 1992. Doctors had not expected him to survive, let alone emerge from the coma. He credited his survival to his wife, Gertruda Grzebska, who cared and prayed for him. He was a father of four at the time of the accident. While disabled he gained eleven grandchildren. In an interview on 1 June 2007 with the Polish news channel TVN 24, Grzebski described his recollections of the communist system's economic collapse. "When my family spoke to me, I could actually hear them but I could not talk back. I could not send them a signal to tell them that I was still alive." He died in 2008.

== See also ==
- List of people who awoke from a coma
- Good Bye Lenin!, a 2003 German film featuring a similar case.
