= Tony Bland =

English man injured in the Hillsborough disaster (1970–1993)

Anthony David Bland (21 September 1970 – 3 March 1993) was a supporter of Liverpool F.C. who was injured in the Hillsborough disaster (15 April 1989). He suffered severe brain damage that left him in a persistent vegetative state; as a consequence of that, the hospital, with the support of his parents, applied for a court order allowing him to "die with dignity". As a result, he became the first patient in English legal history to be allowed to die by the courts through the withdrawal of life-prolonging treatment (including food and water) for the injuries.

== Hillsborough disaster ==
Bland was an 18-year-old Liverpool supporter who travelled with two friends to Sheffield Wednesday's Hillsborough football ground for an FA Cup semi-final between Liverpool and Nottingham Forest on 15 April 1989. During the game, a crush behind the Liverpool goal ensued due to the police losing control of the situation outside the ground. A crush had formed at the outer gates, and the Liverpool fans were eventually let in through a side gate by order of Chief Superintendent Duckenfield. However, he failed to close the tunnel access first and thousands more Liverpool fans were sent down this tunnel into pens 3 and 4 which were already overcrowded due to the failure of police officers and club stewards to direct the fans to the appropriate areas. This resulted in the death of 94 people on that day, and a 95th victim in hospital a few days later.

Although Bland survived the initial crush, he had suffered severe brain damage and eventually became the disaster's 96th victim on 3 March 1993, aged 22, after being in a coma for nearly four years. He never regained consciousness and a legal ruling in November 1992 allowed doctors to withdraw his treatment at the request of his family, as there had been no sign of improvement in his condition and the doctors treating him advised that there was no reasonable possibility that he would ever emerge from his persistent vegetative state, and was unlikely to survive more than five years.

== Injuries and prognosis ==
Bland suffered serious injuries in the crush at the Leppings Lane terrace. He suffered crushed ribs and two punctured lungs, causing an interruption in the supply of oxygen to his brain. As a result, he sustained catastrophic and irreversible damage to the higher centres of the brain, which had left him in a persistent vegetative state (PVS).

He was transferred to the care of J. G. Howe, a consultant geriatrician and neurologist at the Airedale General Hospital near his home in Keighley. He had some experience in treating those with PVS. Several attempts were made by Howe and his team, along with Bland's father, sister and mother, to try to elicit some response from him and for some signs of interaction. However, all attempts failed. He showed no sign of being aware of anything that took place around him.

EEG and CT scans revealed that whilst the brain stem remained intact, there was no cortical activity. Indeed, scans subsequently shown to the court showed more space than substance in the relevant part of his brain. His body was being kept alive by artificial nutrition, hydration and constant care. The medical professionals treating him stated that there was no reasonable possibility that he would ever emerge from his vegetative state.

== Law in England and Wales prior to Bland ==
=== Selective non-treatment of newborn babies ===
Prior to Bland, English case law on the non-treatment of patients was restricted to newborn babies. There have been several recorded cases of disabled neonates being "allowed to die". A leading case was that of Re B (a minor). That case involved a baby with Down syndrome complicated by intestinal obstruction which, if left untreated without surgery, would be fatal. The parents felt that it would be in the child's best interests if she were left to die. This was a decision upheld by Lord Justice Dunn at first instance, who lauded the parents' decision as being "an entirely reasonable one".

The matter reached the Court of Appeal who overturned the decision. Any such decision had to be made in the best interests of the child and that the prognosis was that the child would have a reasonable quality of life. However, in other cases, for example Re C (a minor) (wardship: medical treatment) and Re J (a minor) (wardship: medical treatment), this test has been used to determine that doctors can choose not to treat or provide life prolonging treatment.

=== Doctor's potential liability ===
In R v Arthur a baby was born in 1981 with uncomplicated Down Syndrome and was rejected by the parents. Leonard Arthur, a paediatrician, wrote in his notes that the "Parents do not wish it to survive. Nursing care only." The baby died 69 hours later. During the trial, the defence provided evidence that the child was not physically healthy, resulting in a reduced charge of attempted murder, for which Arthur was acquitted.

This demonstrated that a doctor who deliberately withdrew life-prolonging treatment under any circumstances, and where the patient subsequently died, could be charged with murder. There was a subtle exception. If a patient suffered complications but the doctors felt that it would serve no purpose to apply additional treatments, such as antibiotics to fight infection, as might happen in a case of PVS, and the patient subsequently died as a result of the complication, then they were not liable under the criminal law. Theoretically, however, they could still find themselves being sued for negligence by the family of the deceased.

In August 1989, four months after Bland was injured, Howe contacted Popper, the Sheffield coroner, who was both legally and medically qualified. He informed Popper of the plan to withdraw all treatment including food and water. This decision had been taken following full consultation with the family and in accordance with their wishes. Howe later said:

It is difficult now [in 2006] to convey my shock on receiving his intimidating reply. Having stated that he [the Coroner] had no jurisdiction over any living person, he advised that I would risk a murder charge should I withdraw treatment. He made it clear that he "... could not countenance, condone, approve or give consent to any action or inaction which could be or could not be construed as being designed or intended to shorten or terminate the life of this young man. This particularly applies to the withholding of the necessities of life, such as food and drink." He requested a reply by return indicating that I had understood his opinion, and whether I would withdraw treatment.

The Coroner advised Howe to contact his medical defence society and the Regional Health Authority, and copied his letter to the Chief Constable of the West Midlands Police (the investigating force), the local regional Health Authority solicitor, and Howe's medical defence society. The following day, Howe was visited by the police and told that he would be charged with murder if he withdrew treatment and Bland died.

Following the obtaining of the legal advice, which concurred with that of the coroner, the Airedale National Health Service Trust - with the support of Bland's family and Howe - made an application to court to withdraw all life-prolonging treatment. As Bland was unable to speak for himself and was, for legal purposes, deemed an incompetent, the Official Solicitor was assigned as his guardian ad litem. The Official Solicitor opposed the Trust's application because if the Trust were allowed to pursue the actions proposed by Howe, it would amount in law to the crime of murder.

== Case ==
=== First instance ===
Airedale NHS Trust applied to the courts for a declaration to the effect that:

- they might lawfully discontinue all life-sustaining treatment and medical support measures, including ventilation, nutrition and hydration by artificial means
- any subsequent treatment given should be for the sole purpose of enabling him to end his life in dignity and free from pain and suffering
- if death should then occur, its cause should be attributed to the natural and other causes of his present state
- and that none of those concerned should, as a result, be subject to any criminal or civil liability.

This declaration, apart from the latter part of the declaration (which was deemed inappropriate), was granted. The court considered that it was in the patient's best interests for treatment to be withheld and that its discontinuance was in accordance with good medical practice.

Acting on Anthony Bland's behalf, the Official Solicitor appealed this decision.

=== Court of Appeal ===
==== Expert evidence ====
Such was the importance of the case, and its legal ramifications, that it attracted a number of expert witnesses to give evidence. These included Professor Bryan Jennett who, along with Professor Fred Plum, coined the term 'persistent vegetative state' in 1972. Professor Jennett expressed the view that it would be in accordance with good medical practice in the case of Anthony Bland to withdraw the nasogastric artificial feeding. He considered that there was no benefit to continue with the treatment as there was no prospect of recovery of cognitive function.

Other experts in the field of neurology gave evidence. Amongst those was Professor Peter O'Behan who examined Bland on behalf of the Official Solicitor. Like the experts who gave evidence for the Airedale Trust, Prof. O'Behan's evidence was pessimistic. He stated:

I am confident that from my knowledge of other patients, neuropsychology, previous cases from the literature and from animal experimentation that the patient has no awareness nor can he suffer pain or experience pleasure. Further the prospect of improvement can also confidently be answered since based on what we know of the degree of damage to his brain, the comparison of his case with those recorded in the literature (particularly considering the nature of his damage and the duration of his illness) and the type of systems and signs he exhibits, there is no hint or hope or any prospect of improvement.

== Inquest and failed legal challenge ==
On 21 December 1993, Bradford coroner James Turnbull recorded a verdict of accidental death on Tony Bland. The same verdict was recorded on the other 95 victims (94 who died on the day of the disaster and a 95th who died a few days later) at the main Hillsborough inquest in March 1991, much to the dismay of the bereaved families who had been hoping for a verdict of unlawful killing and for manslaughter charges to be brought against the police who had been patrolling the match. On 26 April 2016, during the second inquest on all 96 victims, a verdict of unlawful killing was issued on all 96 victims.

In the aftermath of Bland's death, a priest and anti-abortion campaigner, James Morrow, started a legal challenge to have the doctor who withdrew his treatment charged with murder, but this was rejected by the High Court in April 1994.

On 28 June 2017, the Crown Prosecution Service announced that David Duckenfield, the police commander, would be charged with manslaughter by gross negligence in relation to the deaths of the other 95 victims, but a charge could not apply in relation to Bland because he died outside of the time limit for death for the alleged offence.

== Moral and legal issues ==
The case brought up a number of moral and legal issues. As a result, the number of previous cases referred to is extensive.

This case is another which delegated to the Bolam standard. This was a test introduced by the courts in Bolam v. Friern Hospital Management Committee. The essence of the Bolam standard is such as to remove liability from medical staff if the treatment they have provided to a patient under the particular circumstances would have been followed by a responsible body of medical personnel, exercising due skill and care in the process. Under Bolam, a doctor need only show that he was following an accepted medical practice — even if that practice was only followed by a minority of medical professionals. This was one of the arguments put forward on behalf of Dr Howe; that it would be intolerable if Dr Howe was charged with murder for following what he submitted to be generally regarded as good medical practice.

A long-time critic of the Bland case, Dr Jacqueline Laing argues that the implications of the judicial decision deserve revisiting given recent Freedom of Information Act requests revealing financial incentives and staggering compliance in rolling out the 2008 NHS End-Of-Life Care strategy. She warns that Bland has been dangerously extended by the Mental Capacity Act 2005 so that novel third parties now have power to remove treatment.

== Andrew Devine ==
Tony Bland was one of two people injured at Hillsborough to have been diagnosed as being in a persistent vegetative state. The other was 22-year-old Andrew Devine, from the Liverpool area, who also suffered massive brain damage as a result of being deprived of oxygen due to crush injuries. In the immediate aftermath of the disaster, his parents were warned by doctors that he was likely to die within a few months. In 1994, five years after the disaster and one year after the death of Tony Bland, Devine's family claimed to have seen him following a moving object with his eyes. By March 1997, Devine was able to communicate to others using a touch-sensitive buzzer to answer "yes" or "no" to questions asked. By the time of the disaster's 20th anniversary in April 2009, it was reported that he continued to show signs of awareness around him but his condition had barely improved since he was first reported to have emerged from the coma 12 years earlier. Devine died on 27 July 2021, 32 years after the disaster, with Liverpool coroner Andre Rebello recording a verdict of unlawful killing, making him the 97th victim.
