= George Ansell =

English footballer

George Thomas Leonard Ansell (28 November 1909 – 7 October 1988) was an English footballer who played professionally as a forward for Brighton and Hove Albion and Norwich City.

Ansell was born in Worthing, Sussex, to George William Ansell and Rebecca Mary Hilda Ansell. In 1918, his father died of wounds received while serving with the Royal Horse Artillery and Royal Field Artillery in the First World War. His mother died suddenly of heart failure in 1930 while working as a domestic servant.

After retiring from football, Ansell became a teacher and was a Master at Kimbolton School, where he taught Latin. He died in Stafford.
