= Karolina Olsson =

Swedish hibernator (1861–1950)

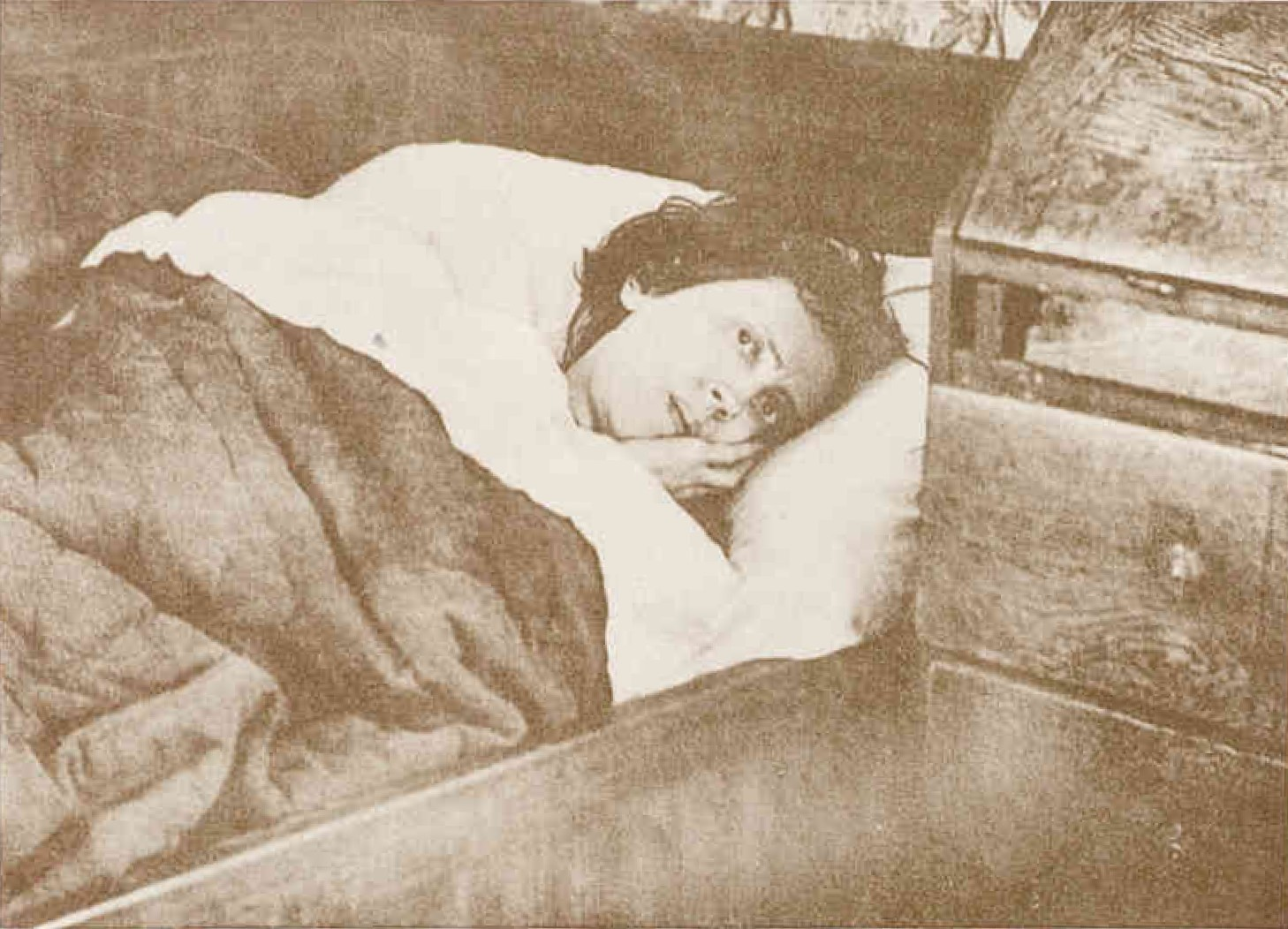
- Olsson on 14 April 1908, just a few days after she purportedly awoke from three decades of hibernation
- Born: 29 October 1861; Oknö, Sweden
- Died: 5 April 1950 (aged 88); Oknö, Sweden
- Known for: 32-year long hibernation

Karolina Olsson (29 October 1861 – 5 April 1950), also known as Soverskan på Oknö ("The Sleeper of Oknö"), was a Swedish woman who purportedly remained in hibernation between 1876 and 1908 (32 years). This is believed to be the longest time that anyone has lived in this manner who then awoke without any residual symptoms.

== Life ==
Olsson was born on 29 October 1861 in Oknö near Mönsterås, the second-eldest of five children; her siblings were all brothers. She suffered a head wound while outdoors at age 14 on 18 February 1876, but seemed to recover from it quickly. On 22 February, she complained of a toothache. Her family believed that her tooth was sore because of witchcraft, and she was ordered to go to bed. However, when she fell asleep, she did not wake up.

Her father was a fisherman and unable to afford a doctor, and the family relied instead on the advice of friends and the town midwife. Olsson's mother force-fed her milk and sugar water. Finally, the neighbors paid for a visit from a doctor, who was unable to wake Olsson and determined that she was in a coma. This doctor continued to visit her for a year, after which he wrote to the editor of Scandinavia's leading medical journal, soliciting the help of other professionals in finding a cure for Olsson's continuous sleep-state. Olsson was visited by doctors who noted that her hair, fingernails, and toenails did not appear to grow. The family reported that Olsson occasionally sat up and "mumble[d] prayers she had learned by rote in childhood".

One doctor who visited Olsson was Johan Emil Almbladh, who thought that her sleep-state was a result of hysteria. In July 1892, Olsson was hospitalized in Oskarshamn, where she was treated with electroconvulsive therapy. On 2 August 1892, she was released from the hospital without awakening or her situation improving. The hospital said that the appropriate diagnosis was "dementia paralytica". However, there is little to suggest that she actually suffered from that illness. She was not re-examined by a doctor until she awoke from her sleep.

During the entire time that she was asleep, Olsson was given two glasses of milk each day. Her mother died in 1904, and after this, a maid continued to take care of Olsson and the household. Upon the death of her brother in 1907, Olsson began crying hysterically, although she remained in an assumed coma. She reportedly did not touch any food that she received during her years in bed, and the family's maid never heard her speaking.

Olsson awoke on 3 April 1908, 32 years and 42 days after she had first fallen asleep. The maid found her crying and jumping on the floor. When her surviving brothers arrived, however, she did not recognize them. She was very thin and pale, and she showed sensitivity to light during the first few days after awakening. She was weak and had difficulty speaking. She could still read and write, and she remembered everything that she had learned before she fell asleep. Newspaper reporters from all over Europe and the United States travelled to Oknö to interview her, and she and her family went into hiding to avoid the attention. She submitted to psychiatric testing in Stockholm and was found to be in full possession of the faculties that she had possessed before she fell asleep. She was described as appearing to be no older than 25 at the age of 46.

== Studies ==
It has been speculated that Olsson may not really have been asleep and hibernating all that time. There were many unexplained characteristics of her state; for example, her hair, fingernails, and toenails did not seem to grow.

Psychiatrist Dr. Frödeström met Olsson in 1910. He published a paper on her condition in 1912 titled La Dormeuse d'Oknö – 21 Ans de Stupeur. Guérison Complète, but his analysis was limited to her situation being an unclear case of hibernation. It was later revealed that Olsson did wake up occasionally and, when she did, she reacted with sorrow and anger. Frödeström speculated that Olsson thought that she was seriously ill, and that she remained still with her eyes closed and refused to eat to elicit sympathy. It has been conjectured that her mother had helped her and kept the fact secret that she was no longer hibernating.

== Death ==
Olsson died on 5 April 1950 aged 88 from an intracranial hemorrhage.

== See also ==
- Catatonia – Psychiatric behavioural syndrome
- Persistent vegetative state – Disorder of consciousness caused by severe brain damage
