= Martin Pistorius =

South African man who had locked-in syndrome

- Born: 31 December 1975 (age 50); Johannesburg, South Africa
- Citizenship: South Africa (1975–present); United Kingdom (2016–present)
- Education: University of Hertfordshire (BSc (Hons), computer science)
- Occupations: Freelance web developer/designer, writer
- Known for: Ghost Boy
- Spouse: Joanna (m. 2009)
- Children: 1
- Website: www.martinpistorius.com

Martin Pistorius (born 31 December 1975) is a South African man who developed an undiagnosed neurological disorder and was unable to communicate for 7 years.

When he was 12, he began losing voluntary motor control and eventually fell into a vegetative state for three years. He began regaining consciousness at around age 16 and achieved full consciousness by age 19, although he was still unable to control his body’s movements with the exception of his eyes. He was unable to communicate with other people until his caregiver, Virna van der Walt, noticed that he could use his eyes to respond to her words. She told his parents, who sent him to the centre for Augmentative and Alternative Communication at the University of Pretoria for testing, where they confirmed that he was conscious and aware of his surroundings.

His parents then gave him a speech computer, and he began slowly regaining some upper body functions. In 2008, he met his wife Joanna through his sister Kim, and in 2009 they married. He co-wrote his autobiography Ghost Boy with Megan Lloyd Davies, which was published in 2011. By that time, Pistorius had regained limited control over his head and arms, but still needed his speech computer to communicate with others. In 2018, it was announced that the couple were expecting a child, and Pistorius was wheelchair racing.

As of 2018, Pistorius works as a freelance web designer and developer.

== Early life ==
During the late 1980s, Pistorius and his parents were living in South Africa, when at the age of 12 he slowly began developing symptoms that included losing the ability to move by himself. Doctors were unable to diagnose the exact ailment and believed it was cryptococcal meningitis and tuberculosis of the brain.

Pistorius eventually fell into a vegetative state that lasted four years, during which time doctors informed his parents that they did not expect Pistorius to re-awaken or survive for much longer.

Starting at age 14, Pistorius received part of his daily care via a care home during the day. At night, he was primarily cared for by his father Rodney, who stated that he woke up every two hours to turn his son so that he would not develop bed sores. While unconscious, Pistorius was able to hear and understand conversations his relatives were having by his bedside, although they did not know this. After recovery, he spoke about major world events – such as Nelson Mandela becoming president, the death of Princess Diana, and the September 11 attacks – that happened when he was unable to communicate.

He hated the children's television program Barney & Friends – re-runs of which were shown in units where he was recovering – and subsequently tried to think about things that gave him some control over his external reality, such as telling the time by tracking sunlight in a room.

Pistorius believes that he began regaining consciousness in the early 1990s, during which time he was able to sense the people around him but did not immediately recall previous events, something he has described as "a bit like a baby being born". Around age 19, Pistorius regained full consciousness and awareness, but was initially unable to impart this to the people around him. He was capable of making small movements that were not initially detected by his primary caregivers. One day, Virna van der Walt – an aromatherapist and one of Pistorius' day carers – began noticing that Pistorius would react to specific statements and questions she made. Upon her recommendations, Pistorius was sent to the Centre For Augmentative And Alternative Communication at the University of Pretoria around age 25. There, they confirmed that he was aware and could respond to statements. He has learned to use augmentative and alternative communication (AAC) to communicate with others.

== Personal life ==
Pistorius met his wife Joanna, a UK resident, in 2008 through his sister Kim, who had moved to England for her job. He later moved there, and they were married in 2009. He described the terrifying experience of being aware but unable to communicate in a short video recording in 2018, when the couple was about to have a child. By that time, although he was still using a wheelchair, he was able to participate in wheelchair racing. Their son, Sebastian Albert Pistorius, was born a few months later on 6 December.

== Published work ==
In 2011, Simon & Schuster published Pistorius' autobiography, Ghost Boy, which he co-wrote with Megan Lloyd Davies. The book met with a favourable response. By 2011, Pistorius had regained some control over his head and arms and could communicate with others via a computer equipped with text-to-speech software.

== Media appearances ==
External media

Audio
- Locked-In Man, Invisibilia, 22:55

Video
- Martin Pistorius, My Way Back to Words, TED Talks, 14:31

Pistorius's story found a considerably larger audience after being featured on the first episode of NPR's podcast Invisibilia, titled "The Secret History of Thoughts".

In 2015, at the TEDx event in Kansas City, Pistorius described how he freed himself from a life locked inside his own body in his talk "How my mind came back to life – and no one knew" and how he suffered from extensive abuse from his caregivers, including sexual abuse. He has given other talks. In 2018, he made a video describing his illness and recovery, and the experience of being fully conscious but unable to communicate.
