= Coma =

State of unconsciousness

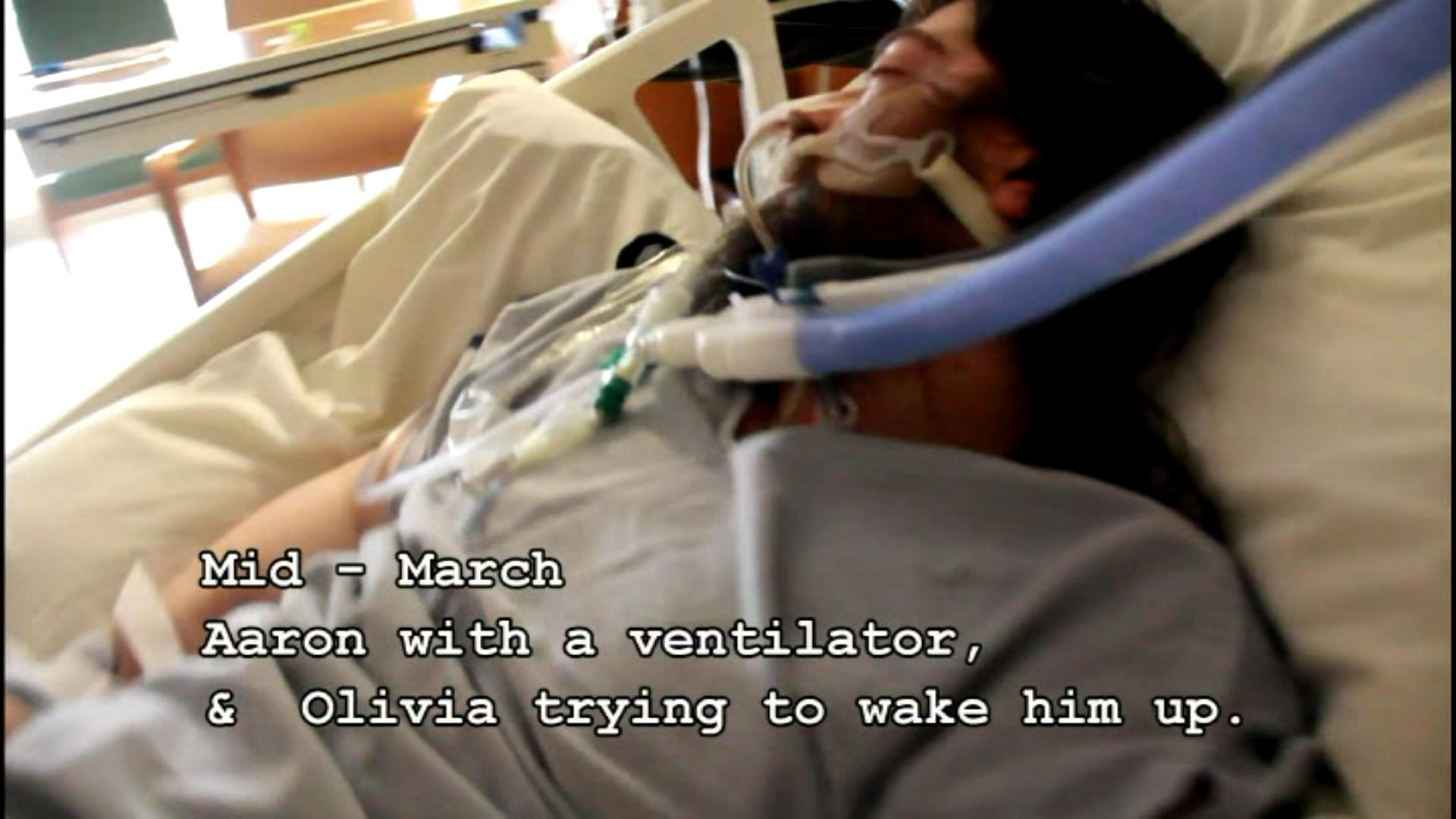
- Image of a comatose man unresponsive to stimuli
- Specialty: Neurology, critical care medicine, psychiatry
- Symptoms: Unconsciousness
- Complications: Persistent vegetative state, death
- Duration: Can vary from a few days to several years

A coma (from Ancient Greek κῶμα koma 'deep sleep') is a prolonged state of deep unconsciousness in which a person cannot be awakened, fails to respond normally to stimuli (including pain, light, and sound), lacks a normal sleep-wake cycle and does not initiate voluntary actions. The person may experience respiratory and circulatory problems due to the body's inability to maintain normal bodily functions. People in a coma often require extensive medical care to maintain their health and prevent complications such as pneumonia or blood clots. Coma patients exhibit a complete absence of wakefulness and are unable to consciously feel, speak or move. Comas can be the result of natural causes, or can be medically induced; for example, during general anesthesia.

Clinically, a coma can be defined as the consistent inability to follow a one-step command. For a patient to maintain consciousness, the components of wakefulness and awareness must be maintained. Wakefulness is a quantitative assessment of the degree of consciousness, whereas awareness is a qualitative assessment of the functions mediated by the cerebral cortex, including cognitive abilities such as attention, sensory perception, explicit memory, language, the execution of tasks, temporal and spatial orientation, and reality judgment. Neurologically, consciousness is maintained by the activation of the cerebral cortex—the gray matter that forms the brain's outermost layer—and by the reticular activating system (RAS), a structure in the brainstem.

== Signs and symptoms ==
General symptoms of a person in a comatose state are:

- Inability to voluntarily open the eyes
- A nonexistent sleep–wake cycle
- Lack of response to physical (painful) or verbal stimuli
- Depressed brainstem reflexes, such as pupils not responding to light
- Abnormal, difficulty, or irregular breathing or no breathing at all when coma was caused by cardiac arrest
- Scores between 3 and 8 on the Glasgow Coma Scale

== Causes ==
Many types of problems can cause a coma. Forty percent of comatose states result from drug poisoning. Certain drug use under certain conditions can damage or weaken the synaptic functioning in the ascending reticular activating system (ARAS) and keep the system from properly functioning to arouse the brain. Secondary effects of drugs, which include abnormal heart rate and blood pressure, as well as abnormal breathing and sweating, may also indirectly harm the functioning of the ARAS and lead to a coma. Given that drug poisoning is the cause for a large portion of patients in a coma, hospitals first test all comatose patients by observing pupil size and eye movement, through the vestibular–ocular reflex. (See Diagnosis below.)

The second most common cause of coma, which makes up about 25% of cases, is lack of oxygen, generally resulting from cardiac arrest. The central nervous system (CNS) requires a great deal of oxygen for its neurons. Oxygen deprivation in the brain, or cerebral hypoxia, causes sodium and calcium from outside of the neurons to decrease and intracellular calcium to increase, which harms neuron communication. Lack of oxygen in the brain also causes ATP exhaustion and cellular breakdown from cytoskeleton damage and nitric oxide production.

Twenty percent of comatose states result from an ischemic stroke, brain hemorrhage, or brain tumor. During a stroke, blood flow to part of the brain is restricted or blocked. An ischemic stroke, brain hemorrhage, or brain tumor may cause restriction of blood flow. Lack of blood to cells in the brain prevents oxygen from getting to the neurons, and consequently causes cells to become disrupted and die. As brain cells die, brain tissue continues to deteriorate, which may affect the functioning of the ARAS, causing unconsciousness and coma.

Comatose cases can also result from traumatic brain injury, excessive blood loss, malnutrition, hypothermia, hyperthermia, hyperammonemia, abnormal glucose levels, and many other biological disorders. Furthermore, studies show that 1 out of 8 patients with traumatic brain injury experience a comatose state.

Heart-related causes of coma include cardiac arrest, ventricular fibrillation, ventricular tachycardia, atrial fibrillation, myocardial infarction, heart failure, arrhythmia when severe, cardiogenic shock, myocarditis, and pericarditis. Respiratory arrest is the only lung condition to cause coma; many different lung conditions can cause decreased level of consciousness, but do not reach coma.

Other causes of coma include severe or persistent seizures, kidney failure, liver failure, hyperglycemia, hypoglycemia, and infections involving the brain, like meningitis and encephalitis.

== Pathophysiology ==
Injury to either or both of the cerebral cortex or the reticular activating system (RAS) is sufficient to cause a person to enter coma.

The cerebral cortex is the outer layer of neural tissue of the cerebrum of the brain. The cerebral cortex is composed of gray matter which consists of the nuclei of neurons, whereas the inner portion of the cerebrum is composed of white matter and is composed of the axons of neuron. White matter is responsible for perception, relay of the sensory input via the thalamic pathway, and many other neurological functions, including complex thinking.

The RAS, on the other hand, is a more primitive structure in the brainstem which includes the reticular formation (RF). The RAS has two tracts, the ascending and descending tract. The ascending tract, or ascending reticular activating system (ARAS), is made up of a system of acetylcholine-producing neurons, and works to arouse and wake up the brain. Arousal of the brain begins from the RF, through the thalamus, and then finally to the cerebral cortex. Any impairment in ARAS functioning, a neuronal dysfunction, along the arousal pathway stated directly above, prevents the body from being aware of its surroundings. Without the arousal and consciousness centers, the body cannot awaken, remaining in a comatose state.

The severity and mode of onset of coma depends on the underlying cause. There are two main subdivisions of a coma: structural and diffuse neuronal. A structural cause, for example, is brought upon by a mechanical force that brings about cellular damage, such as physical pressure or a blockage in neural transmission. By contrast, a diffuse cause is limited to aberrations of cellular function which fall under a metabolic or toxic subgroup. Toxin-induced comas are caused by extrinsic substances, whereas metabolic-induced comas are caused by intrinsic processes, such as body thermoregulation or ionic imbalances (e.g. sodium). For instance, severe hypoglycemia (low blood sugar) or hypercapnia (increased carbon dioxide levels in the blood) are examples of a metabolic diffuse neuronal dysfunction. Hypoglycemia or hypercapnia initially cause mild agitation and confusion, but progress to obtundation, stupor, and finally, complete unconsciousness. In contrast, coma resulting from a severe traumatic brain injury or subarachnoid hemorrhage can be instantaneous. The mode of onset may therefore be indicative of the underlying cause.

Structural and diffuse causes of coma are not isolated from one another, as one can lead to the other in some situations. For instance, coma induced by a diffuse metabolic process, such as hypoglycemia, can result in a structural coma if it is not resolved. Another example is if cerebral edema, a diffuse dysfunction, leads to ischemia of the brainstem, a structural issue, due to the blockage of the circulation in the brain.

== Diagnosis ==
Although diagnosis of coma is simple, investigating the underlying cause of onset can be rather challenging. As such, after gaining stabilization of the patient's airways, breathing, and circulation (the basic ABCs), various diagnostic tests, such as physical examinations and imaging tools (CT scan, MRI, etc.), are used to diagnose the underlying cause of the coma.

When an unconscious person enters a hospital, the hospital uses a series of diagnostic steps to identify the cause of unconsciousness. According to Young, the following steps should be taken when dealing with a patient possibly in a coma:

1. Perform a general examination and medical history check
2. Make sure the patient is in an actual comatose state and is not in a locked-in state or experiencing psychogenic unresponsiveness. Patients with locked-in syndrome present with voluntary movement of their eyes, whereas patients with psychogenic comas demonstrate active resistance to passive opening of the eyelids, with the eyelids closing abruptly and completely when the lifted upper eyelid is released (rather than slowly, asymmetrically and incompletely as seen in comas due to organic causes).
3. Find the site of the brain that may be causing coma (e.g., brainstem, back of brain...) and assess the severity of the coma with the Glasgow Coma Scale
4. Take blood work to see if drugs were involved or if it was a result of hypoventilation/hyperventilation
5. Check for levels of serum glucose, calcium, sodium, potassium, magnesium, phosphate, urea, and creatinine
6. Perform brain scans to observe any abnormal brain functioning using either CT or MRI scans
7. Continue to monitor brain waves and identify seizures of patient using EEGs

=== Initial evaluation ===
In the initial assessment of coma, it is common to gauge the level of consciousness on the AVPU (alert, vocal stimuli, painful stimuli, unresponsive) scale by spontaneously exhibiting actions and, assessing the patient's response to vocal and painful stimuli. More elaborate scales, such as the Glasgow Coma Scale, quantify an individual's reactions such as eye opening, movement and verbal response in order to indicate their extent of brain injury. The patient's score can vary from a score of 3 (indicating severe brain injury and death) to 15 (indicating mild or no brain injury).

In those with deep unconsciousness, there is a risk of asphyxiation as the control over the muscles in the face and throat is diminished. As a result, those presenting to a hospital with coma are typically assessed for this risk ("airway management"). If the risk of asphyxiation is deemed high, doctors may use various devices (such as an oropharyngeal airway, nasopharyngeal airway or endotracheal tube) to safeguard the airway.

=== Imaging and testing ===
Imaging encompasses computed tomography (CAT or CT) scan of the brain, or MRI for example, and is performed to identify specific causes of the coma, such as hemorrhage in the brain or herniation of the brain structures. Special tests such as an EEG can also show a lot about the activity level of the cortex such as semantic processing, presence of seizures, and are important available tools not only for the assessment of the cortical activity but also for predicting the likelihood of the patient's awakening. In advanced cases, a technique called the Perturbational Complexity Index (PCI), which combines transcranial magnetic stimulation (TMS) with EEG, has been developed to assess the capacity for consciousness by measuring the complexity of brain responses. PCI has shown promise in distinguishing between vegetative and minimally conscious states, even when behavioral signs are absent. The autonomous responses such as the skin conductance response may also provide further insight on the patient's emotional processing.

In the treatment of traumatic brain injury (TBI), there are four examination methods that have proved useful: skull x-ray, angiography, computed tomography (CT), and magnetic resonance imaging (MRI). The skull x-ray can detect linear fractures, impression fractures (expression fractures) and burst fractures. Angiography is used on rare occasions for TBIs i.e. when there is suspicion of an aneurysm, carotid sinus fistula, traumatic vascular occlusion, and vascular dissection. A CT can detect changes in density between the brain tissue and hemorrhages like subdural and intracerebral hemorrhages. MRIs are not the first choice in emergencies because of the long scanning times and because fractures cannot be detected as well as CT. MRIs are used for the imaging of soft tissues and lesions in the posterior fossa which cannot be found with the use of CT.

=== Body movements ===
Assessment of the brainstem and cortical function through special reflex tests such as the oculocephalic reflex test (doll's eyes test), oculovestibular reflex test (cold caloric test), corneal reflex, and the gag reflex. Reflexes are a good indicator of what cranial nerves are still intact and functioning and is an important part of the physical exam. Due to the unconscious status of the patient, only a limited number of the nerves can be assessed. These include the cranial nerves number 2 (CN II), number 3 (CN III), number 5 (CN V), number 7 (CN VII), and cranial nerves 9 and 10 (CN IX, CN X).

| Type of reflex | Description |
|---|---|
| Oculocephalic reflex | Oculocephalic reflex, also known as the doll's eye, is performed to assess the integrity of the brainstem.: Patient's eyelids are gently elevated and the cornea is visualized.; The patient's head is then moved to the patient's left, to observe whether the eyes stay or deviate toward the patient's right; same maneuver is attempted on the opposite side.; If the patient's eyes move in a direction opposite to the direction of the rotation of the head, then the patient is said to have an intact brainstem.; However, failure of both eyes to move to one side can indicate damage or destruction of the affected side. In special cases, where only one eye deviates and the other does not, this often indicates a lesion (or damage) of the medial longitudinal fasciculus (MLF), which is a brainstem nerve tract. |
| Pupillary light reflex | Pupil reaction to light is important because it shows an intact retina, and cranial nerve number 2 (CN II): If pupils are reactive to light, then that also indicates that the cranial nerve number 3 (CN III) (or at least its parasympathetic fibers) are intact. |
| Oculovestibular reflex (Cold Caloric Test) | Caloric reflex test also evaluates both cortical and brainstem function: Cold water is injected into one ear and the patient is observed for eye movement; If the patient's eyes slowly deviate toward the ear where the water was injected, then the brainstem is intact, however failure to deviate toward the injected ear indicates damage of the brainstem on that side.; The cortex is responsible for a rapid nystagmus away from this deviated position and is often seen in patients who are conscious or merely lethargic. |
| Corneal reflex | The corneal reflex assesses the proper function of the trigeminal nerve (CN 5) and facial nerve (CN 7), and is present at infancy.: Lightly touching the cornea with a tissue or cotton swab induces a rapid blink reflex of both eyes.; Touching the sclera or eyelashes, presenting a light flash, or stimulating the supraorbital nerve will induce a less rapid but still reliable response.; Those in a comatose state will have altered corneal reflex depending on the severity of their unconscious and the location of their lesion. |
| Gag reflex | The gag, or pharyngeal, reflex is centered in the medulla and consists of the reflexive motor response of pharyngeal elevation and constriction with tongue retraction in response to sensory stimulation of the pharyngeal wall, posterior tongue, tonsils, or faucial pillars.: This reflex is examined by touching the posterior pharynx with the soft tip of a cotton applicator and visually inspecting for elevation of the pharynx.; Those in comatose states will often demonstrate poor gag reflexes if there has been damage to their glossopharyngeal (CN 9) or vagus nerve (CN 10). |

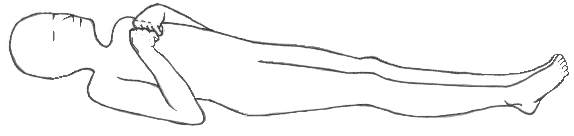
Decorticate posturing, indicating a lesion at the red nucleus or above. This positioning is stereotypical for upper brain stem, or cortical damage. The other variant is decerebrate posturing, not seen in this picture.

Assessment of posture and physique is the next step. It involves general observation about the patient's positioning. There are often two stereotypical postures seen in comatose patients. Decorticate posturing is a stereotypical posturing in which the patient has arms flexed at the elbow, and arms adducted toward the body, with both legs extended. Decerebrate posturing is a stereotypical posturing in which the legs are similarly extended (stretched), but the arms are also stretched (extended at the elbow). The posturing is critical since it indicates where the damage is in the central nervous system. A decorticate posturing indicates a lesion (a point of damage) at or above the red nucleus, whereas a decerebrate posturing indicates a lesion at or below the red nucleus. In other words, a decorticate lesion is closer to the cortex, as opposed to a decerebrate posturing which indicates that the lesion is closer to the brainstem.

=== Pupil size ===
Pupil assessment is often a critical portion of a comatose examination, as it can give information as to the cause of the coma; the following table is a technical, medical guideline for common pupil findings and their possible interpretations:

| Pupil sizes (left eye vs. right eye) | Possible interpretation |
|---|---|
| Eyes open and pupils equal-dilation, normal size | Normal eye with two pupils equal in size and reactive to light. This means that the patient is probably not in a coma and is probably lethargic, under influence of a drug, or sleeping. |
| Eyes open, pupils smaller than expected and equal | "Pinpoint" pupils indicate heroin or opiate overdose, which can be responsible for a patient's coma. The pinpoint pupils are still reactive to light bilaterally (in both eyes, not just one). Another possibility is damage to the pons. |
| Eyes open, right pupil much larger than left | One pupil is dilated and unreactive, while the other is normal (in this case, the right eye is dilated, while the left eye is normal in size). This could mean damage to the oculomotor nerve (cranial nerve number 3, CN III) on the right side, or indicate the possibility of vascular involvement. |
| Eyes open, both pupils widely dilated | Both pupils are dilated and unreactive to light. This could be due to overdose of certain medications, hypothermia or severe anoxia (lack of oxygen). |

=== Severity ===
A coma can be classified as (1) supratentorial (above Tentorium cerebelli), (2) infratentorial (below Tentorium cerebelli), (3) metabolic or (4) diffused. This classification is merely dependent on the position of the original damage that caused the coma, and does not correlate with severity or the prognosis. The severity of coma impairment however is categorized into several levels. Patients may or may not progress through these levels. In the first level, the brain responsiveness lessens, normal reflexes are lost, the patient no longer responds to pain and cannot hear.

The Rancho Los Amigos Scale is a complex scale that has eight separate levels, and is often used in the first few weeks or months of coma while the patient is under closer observation, and when shifts between levels are more frequent.

== Treatment ==
Treatment for people in a coma will depend on the severity and cause of the comatose state. Upon admittance to an emergency department, coma patients will usually be placed in an Intensive Care Unit (ICU) immediately, where maintenance of the patient's respiration and circulation become a first priority. Stability of their respiration and circulation is sustained through the use of intubation, ventilation, administration of intravenous fluids or blood and other supportive care as needed.

=== Continued care ===
Once a patient is stable and no longer in immediate danger, there may be a shift of priority from stabilizing the patient to maintaining the state of their physical wellbeing. Moving patients every 2–3 hours by turning them side to side is crucial to avoiding bed sores as a result of being confined to a bed. Moving patients through the use of physical therapy also aids in preventing atelectasis, contractures or other orthopedic deformities which would interfere with a coma patient's recovery.

Pneumonia is also common in coma patients due to their inability to swallow which can then lead to aspiration. A coma patient's lack of a gag reflex and use of a feeding tube can result in food, drink or other solid organic matter being lodged within their lower respiratory tract (from the trachea to the lungs). This trapping of matter in their lower respiratory tract can ultimately lead to infection, resulting in aspiration pneumonia.

Coma patients may also deal with restlessness or seizures. Soft cloth restraints may be used to prevent them from pulling on tubes or dressings and side rails on the bed should be kept up to prevent patients from falling.

=== Caregivers ===
Coma has a wide variety of emotional reactions from the family members of the affected patients, as well as the primary care givers taking care of the patients. Research has shown that the severity of injury causing coma was found to have no significant impact compared to how much time has passed since the injury occurred. Common reactions, such as desperation, anger, frustration, and denial are possible. The focus of the patient care should be on creating an amicable relationship with the family members or dependents of a comatose patient as well as creating a rapport with the medical staff. Although there is heavy importance of a primary care taker, secondary care takers can play a supporting role to temporarily relieve the primary care taker's burden of tasks.

== Prognosis ==
Comas can last from several days to, in particularly extreme cases, years. Some patients eventually gradually come out of the coma, some progress to a vegetative state or a minimally conscious state, and others die. Some patients who have entered a vegetative state go on to regain a degree of awareness; and in some cases may remain in vegetative state for years or even decades such as the Aruna Shanbaug case or Edwarda O'Bara.

Predicted chances of recovery will differ depending on which techniques were used to measure the patient's severity of neurological damage. Predictions of recovery are based on statistical rates, expressed as the level of chance the person has of recovering. Time is the best general predictor of a chance of recovery. For example, after four months of coma caused by brain damage, the chance of partial recovery is less than 15%, and the chance of full recovery is very low.

The outcome for coma and vegetative state depends on the cause, location, severity and extent of neurological damage. A deeper coma alone does not necessarily mean a slimmer chance of recovery; similarly, a milder coma does not indicate a higher chance of recovery. The most common cause of death for a person in a vegetative state is secondary infection such as pneumonia, which can occur in patients who lie still for extended periods.

=== Recovery ===
People may emerge from a coma with a combination of physical, intellectual, and psychological difficulties that need special attention. It is common for coma patients to awaken in a profound state of confusion and experience dysarthria, the inability to articulate any speech. Recovery is usually gradual. In the first days, the patient may only awaken for a few minutes, with increased duration of wakefulness as their recovery progresses, and they may eventually recover full awareness. That said, some patients may never progress beyond very basic responses.

There are reports of people coming out of a coma after long periods of time. After 19 years in a minimally conscious state, Terry Wallis spontaneously began speaking and regained awareness of his surroundings.

A man with brain damage and trapped in a coma-like state for six years was brought back to consciousness in 2003 by doctors who planted electrodes deep inside his brain. The method, called deep brain stimulation (DBS), successfully roused communication, complex movement and eating ability in the man with a traumatic brain injury. His injuries left him in a minimally conscious state, a condition akin to a coma but characterized by occasional, but brief, evidence of environmental and self-awareness that coma patients lack.

== Society and culture ==
Research by Eelco Wijdicks on the depiction of comas in movies was published in Neurology in May 2006. Wijdicks studied 30 films (made between 1970 and 2004) that portrayed actors in prolonged comas, and he concluded that only two films accurately depicted the state of a coma patient and the agony of waiting for a patient to awaken: Reversal of Fortune (1990) and The Dreamlife of Angels (1998). The remaining 28 were criticized for portraying miraculous awakenings with no lasting side effects, unrealistic depictions of treatments and equipment required, and comatose patients remaining muscular and tanned.

=== Bioethics ===
A person in a coma is said to be in an unconscious state. Perspectives on personhood, identity and consciousness come into play when discussing the metaphysical and bioethical views on comas.

It has been argued that unawareness should be just as ethically relevant and important as a state of awareness and that there should be metaphysical support of unawareness as a state.

In the ethical discussions about disorders of consciousness (DOCs), two abilities are usually considered as central: experiencing well-being and having interest. Well-being can broadly be understood as the positive effect related to what makes life good (according to specific standards) for the individual in question. The only condition for well-being broadly considered is the ability to experience its 'positiveness'. That said, because experiencing positiveness is a basic emotional process with phylogenetic roots, it is likely to occur at a completely unaware level and, therefore, introduces the idea of an unconscious well-being. As such, the ability of having interests is crucial for describing two abilities which those with comas are deficient in. Having an interest in a certain domain can be understood as having a stake in something that can affect what makes our life good in that domain. An interest is what directly and immediately improves life from a certain point of view or within a particular domain, or greatly increases the likelihood of life improvement enabling the subject to realize some good. That said, sensitivity to reward signals is a fundamental element in the learning process, both consciously and unconsciously. Moreover, the unconscious brain is able to interact with its surroundings in a meaningful way and to produce meaningful information processing of stimuli coming from the external environment, including other people.

According to Hawkins, "1. A life is good if the subject is able to value, or more basically if the subject is able to care. Importantly, Hawkins stresses that caring has no need for cognitive commitment, i.e. for high-level cognitive activities: it requires being able to distinguish something, track it for a while, recognize it over time, and have certain emotional dispositions vis-à-vis something. 2. A life is good if the subject has the capacity for relationship with others, i.e. for meaningfully interacting with other people." This suggests that unawareness may (at least partly) fulfill both conditions identified by Hawkins for life to be good for a subject, thus making the unconscious ethically relevant.

== See also ==
- Brain death, lack of activity in both cortex, and lack of brainstem function
- Coma scale, a system to assess the severity of coma
- Locked-in syndrome, paralysis of most muscles, except ocular muscles of the eyes, while patient is conscious
- Near-death experience, type of experience registered by people in a state of coma.
- Persistent vegetative state (vegetative coma), deep coma without detectable awareness. Damage to the cortex, with an intact brainstem.
- Process Oriented Coma Work, for an approach to working with residual consciousness in comatose patients.
- Recovery position
- Suspended animation, the inducement of a temporary cessation or decay of main body functions.
