= Blinking =

Rapid closing and opening of the eyelid

Human eye blinking

Blinking is a bodily function; it is a semi-autonomic rapid closing of the eyelid. A single blink consists of the closing of the eyelid or inactivation of the levator palpebrae superioris and the activation of the palpebral portion of the orbicularis oculi. It is an essential function of the eye that helps spread tears across and remove irritants from the surface of the cornea and conjunctiva.

Blinking may have other functions since it occurs more often than necessary just to keep the eye lubricated. It may help with disengagement of attention; following blink onset, cortical activity decreases in the dorsal network and increases in the default-mode network, associated with internal processing. Blink speed can be affected by elements such as fatigue, eye injury, medication, and disease. The blinking rate is determined by the "blinking center", but it can also be affected by external stimulus.

Some animals, such as tortoises and hamsters, blink their eyes independently of each other. Humans use winking, the blinking of only one eye, as a form of body language.

== Function and anatomy ==
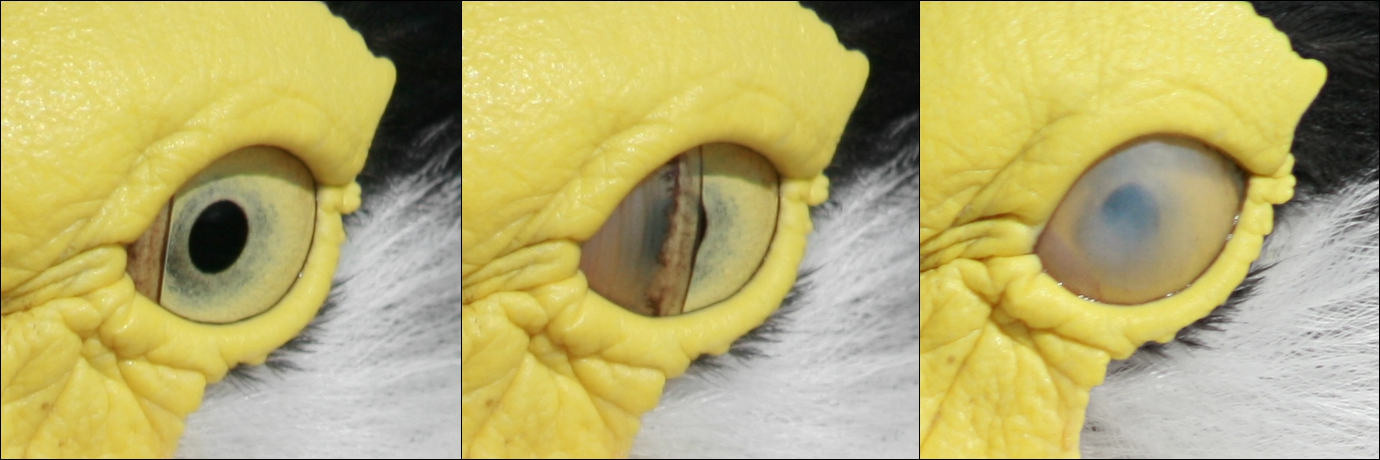
Birds, reptiles and sharks blink with a nictitating membrane from one side of the eye to the other.

Blinking provides moisture to the eye by irrigation using tears and a lubricant the eyes secrete. The eyelid provides suction across the eye from the tear duct to the entire eyeball to keep it from drying out.

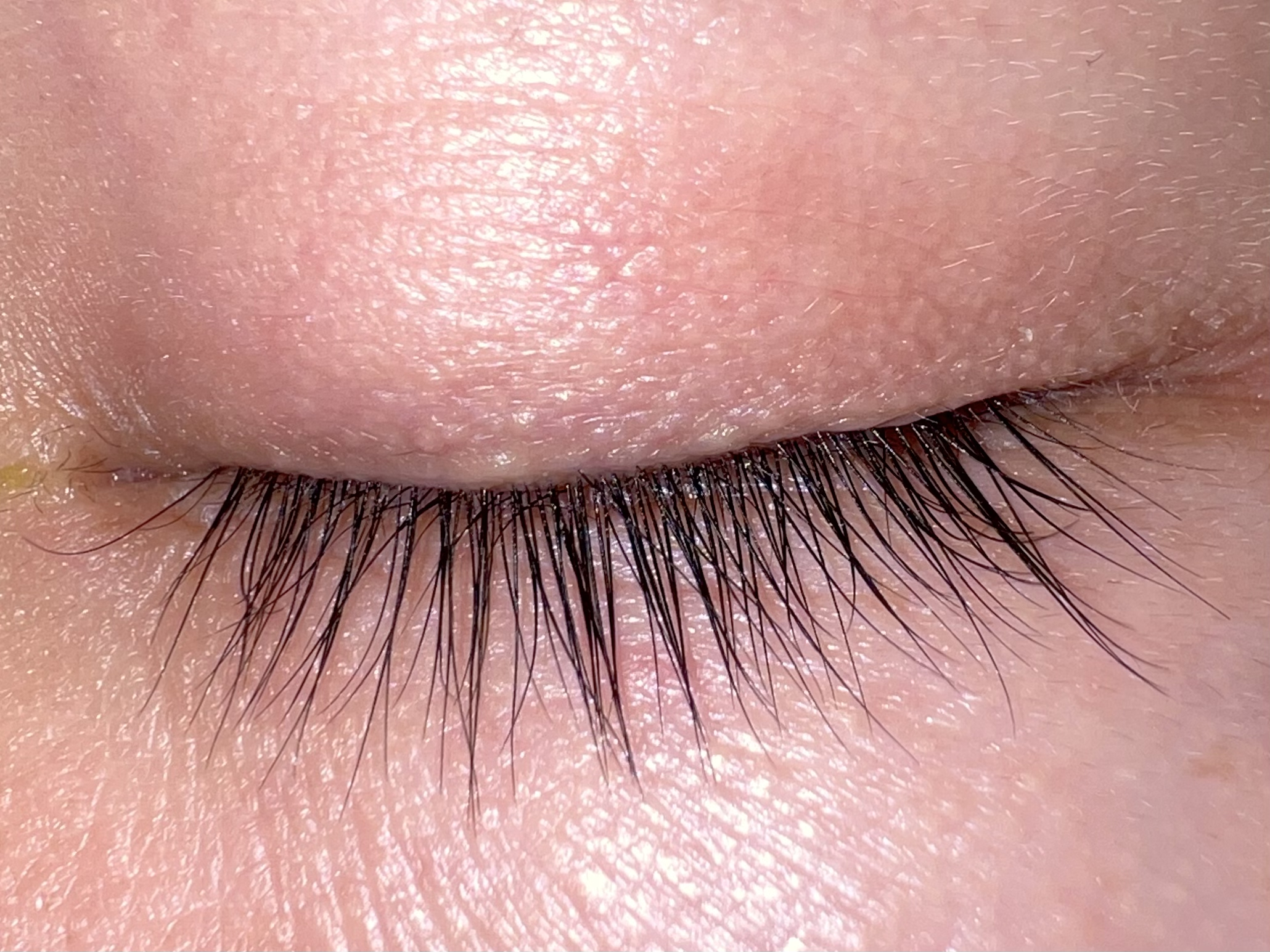
Closed eye of a human, displaying eyelashes, which function to catch irritants when the eye is blinked.

Blinking also protects the eye from irritants. Eyelashes are hairs which grow from the edges of the upper and lower eyelids that create a line of defense against dust and other elements to the eye. The eyelashes catch most of these irritants before they reach the eyeball.

There are multiple muscles that control reflexes of blinking. The main muscles, in the upper eyelid, that control the opening and closing are the orbicularis oculi and levator palpebrae superioris muscle. The orbicularis oculi closes the eye, while the contraction of the levator palpebrae muscle opens the eye. The Müller's muscle, or the superior tarsal muscle, in the upper eyelid and the inferior palpebral muscle in the lower 3 eyelid are responsible for widening the eyes. These muscles are not only imperative in blinking, but they are also important in many other functions such as squinting and winking. The inferior palpebral muscle is coordinated with the inferior rectus to pull down the lower lid when one looks down.

The correlation between human eyelid blink behavior and psychological stress was also demonstrated by means of a laboratory study. Lying may affect the rate of blinking.

Blinking is used for communication in humans, some primates, in human interactions with cats, and by female concave-eared torrent frogs to initiate mating with males.

=== Central nervous system's control ===
Though one may think that the stimulus triggering blinking is dry or irritated eyes, it is most likely that it is controlled by a "blinking center" of the globus pallidus of the lenticular nucleus—a body of nerve cells between the base and outer surface of the brain. Nevertheless, external stimuli can contribute. The orbicularis oculi is a facial muscle; therefore its actions are translated by the facial nerve root. The levator palpebrae superioris' action is sent through the oculomotor nerve. The duration of a blink is on average 100–150 milliseconds according to UCL researcher and between 100 and 400 ms according to the Harvard Database of Useful Biological Numbers. Closures in excess of 1000 ms were defined as microsleeps.

Greater activation of dopaminergic pathways dopamine production in the striatum is associated with a higher rate of spontaneous eye blinking. Conditions in which there is reduced dopamine availability such as Parkinson's disease have reduced eye blink rate, while conditions in which it is raised such as schizophrenia have an increased rate. Blink rate is associated with dopamine-related executive function and creativity.

=== Evolutionary origins ===
Blinking is present in all major tetrapod crown groups. The soft tissues involved in blinking have not been preserved in the fossil record, but study of mudskippers (a group of amphibious fish species that evolved blinking independently from other tetrapod species, but for similar purposes), suggest that blinking (which involves the eye retracting in mudskippers) may have arisen in response to selective pressures upon species shifting from aquatic to terrestrial habitats. For example, compared to an aquatic environment, in a terrestrial environment, the corneal cells must be kept moist such that vital substances like oxygen can more easily diffuse into them, detritus may adhere to the eye in dry conditions, and objects may move towards the eye at faster and more dangerous speeds in air than in water. Additionally, when at their fully aquatic juvenile stage of development, their eyes are not in the positioning with which they blink, but as adults, their eyes elevate to a position that can blink, which they do when they are not submerged or bump into a surface, suggesting blinking emerged as an adaptation to terrestrial life as opposed to aquatic life.

Early tetrapods in the transition to land, which would later yield all non-mudskipper blinking species, possessed similar characteristics regarding eye positioning that suggest blinking arose in response to aerial vision and terrestrial lifestyle.

== Types of blinking ==
There are three types of blinking.

=== Spontaneous blink ===
Spontaneous blinking is done without external stimuli and internal effort. This type of blinking is conducted in the pre-motor brain stem and happens without conscious effort, like breathing and digestion.

=== Reflex blink ===
A reflex blink occurs in response to an external stimulus, such as contact with the cornea or objects that appear rapidly in front of the eye. A reflex blink is not necessarily a conscious blink either; however it does happen faster than a spontaneous blink. Reflex blink may occur in response to tactile stimuli (e.g., corneal, eyelash, skin of eyelid, contact with eyebrow), optical stimuli (e.g. dazzle reflex, or menace reflex) or auditory stimuli (e.g., menace reflex).

=== Voluntary blink ===
A voluntary blink is a conscious blink, with the use of all 3 divisions of the orbicularis oculi muscle.

== Blinking in everyday life ==
=== Children ===
Infants do not blink at the same rate of adults; in fact, infants only blink at an average rate of one or two times in a minute. The reason for this difference is unknown, but it is suggested that infants do not require the same amount of eye lubrication that adults do because their eyelid opening is smaller in relation to adults. Additionally, infants do not produce tears during their first month of life. Infants also get a significant amount more sleep than adults do and, as discussed earlier, fatigued eyes blink more. However, throughout childhood the blink rate increases, and by adolescence, it is usually equivalent to that of adults.

=== Adults ===
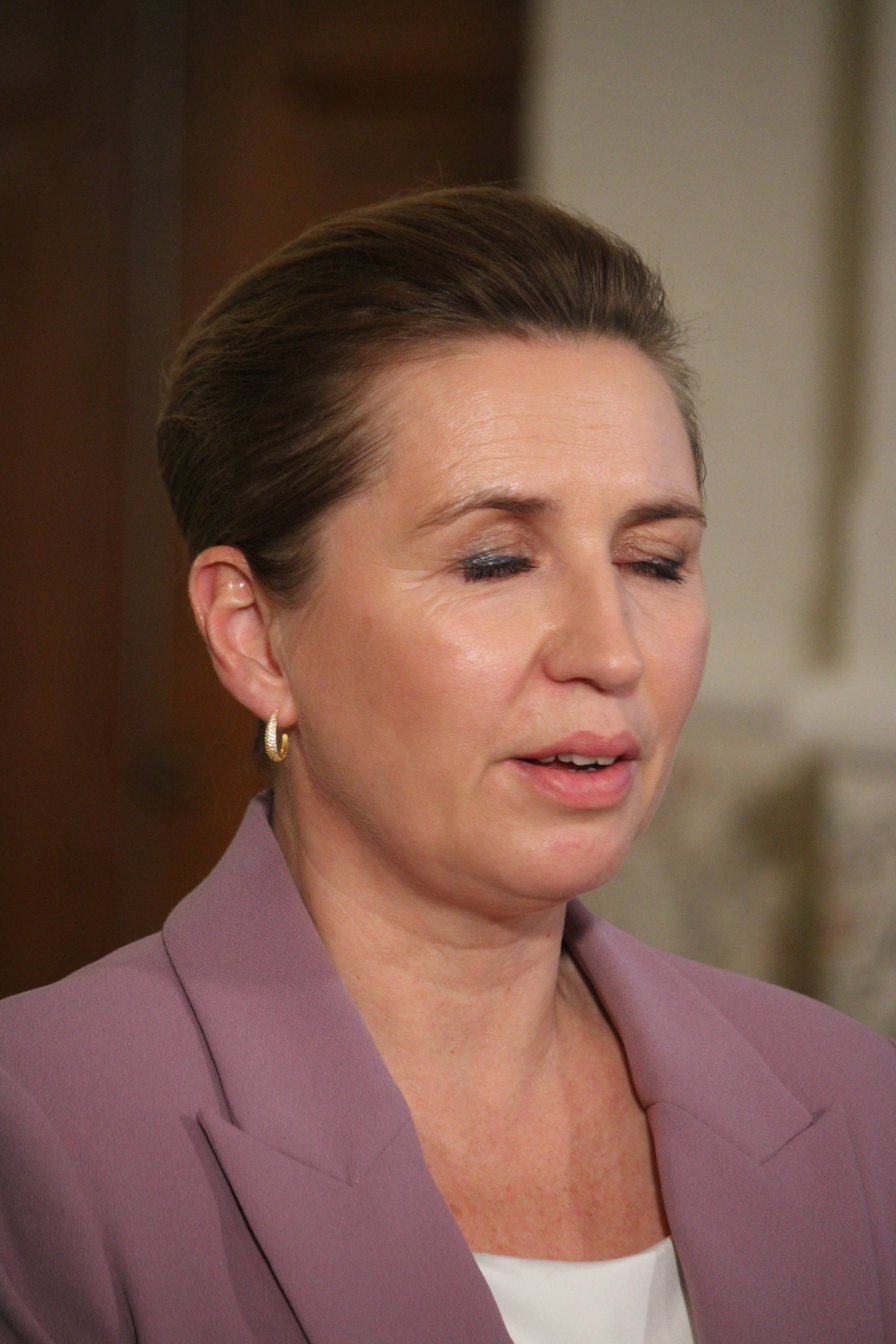
An adult woman (Mette Frederiksen) blinking

There have been mixed results when studying differences in blinking rates between men and women, with results varying from the women's rate nearly doubling the men's to no significant difference between them. In addition, women using oral contraceptives blink 32% more often than other women on average for unknown reasons. Generally, between each blink is an interval of 2–10 seconds; actual rates vary by individual, averaging around 17 blinks per minute in a laboratory setting. However, when the eyes are focused on an object for an extended period of time, such as when reading, the rate of blinking decreases to about 4 to 5 times per minute. This is the major reason that eyes dry out and become fatigued when reading.

When the eyes dry out or become fatigued due to reading on a computer screen, it can be an indication of computer vision syndrome. Computer vision syndrome can be prevented by taking regular breaks, focusing on objects far from the screen, having a well-lit workplace, or using a blink reminder application. Studies suggest that adults can learn to maintain a healthy blinking rate while reading or looking at a computer screen using biofeedback.

Eye blinking can be a criterion for diagnosing medical conditions. For example, excessive blinking may help to indicate the onset of Tourette syndrome, strokes or disorders of the nervous system. A reduced rate of blinking is associated with Parkinson's disease.

== See also ==
- Jeremiah Denton - American prisoner of war who blinked his eyes in Morse code, spelling the word "T-O-R-T-U-R-E"—and confirming for the first time to U.S. Naval Intelligence that American POWs were being tortured.
- Corneal reflex
- Reflex
