= Four Score =

Four Score may refer to:

- Archaic term for 80
- Four Score, a cocktail created by Joe Gilmore
- The NES Four Score, a four-controller adapter for the NES
- "Fourscore", a 1982 piece of music composed by David Dundas, used as the original theme tune to UK television station Channel 4
- The first words of Abraham Lincoln's Gettysburg Address
- The FOUR Score (Coma Scale) (Full Outline of UnResponsiveness Score), a clinical grading scale for the assessment of level of consciousness
