= Early warning (disambiguation) =

The term "early warning" may refer to

- Warning system
- Airborne early warning and control
- Early warning score, a clinical tool used to predict patient deterioration
- Early warning system
- Early Warning (Baby Animals song)
- Early Warning Services, the company that owns Zelle (payment service)
- Early-warning radar
- Early Warning (novel), a book by Jane Smiley
