= Pain stimulus =

Pain stimulus is a technique used by medical personnel for assessing the consciousness level of a person who is not responding to normal interaction, voice commands or gentle physical stimuli (such as shaking of the shoulders). It forms one part of a number of neurological assessments, including the first aid based AVPU scale and the more medically based Glasgow Coma Scale.

The objective of pain stimulus is to assess the level of consciousness of the patient by inducing vocalisation in an acceptable, consistent and replicable manner, and to this end, there are a limited number of techniques which are normally considered acceptable.

The pain stimulus can be applied centrally and/or peripherally, and there are benefits and drawbacks to each type of stimulus, depending on the type of patient and the response being assessed.

== Central stimuli ==
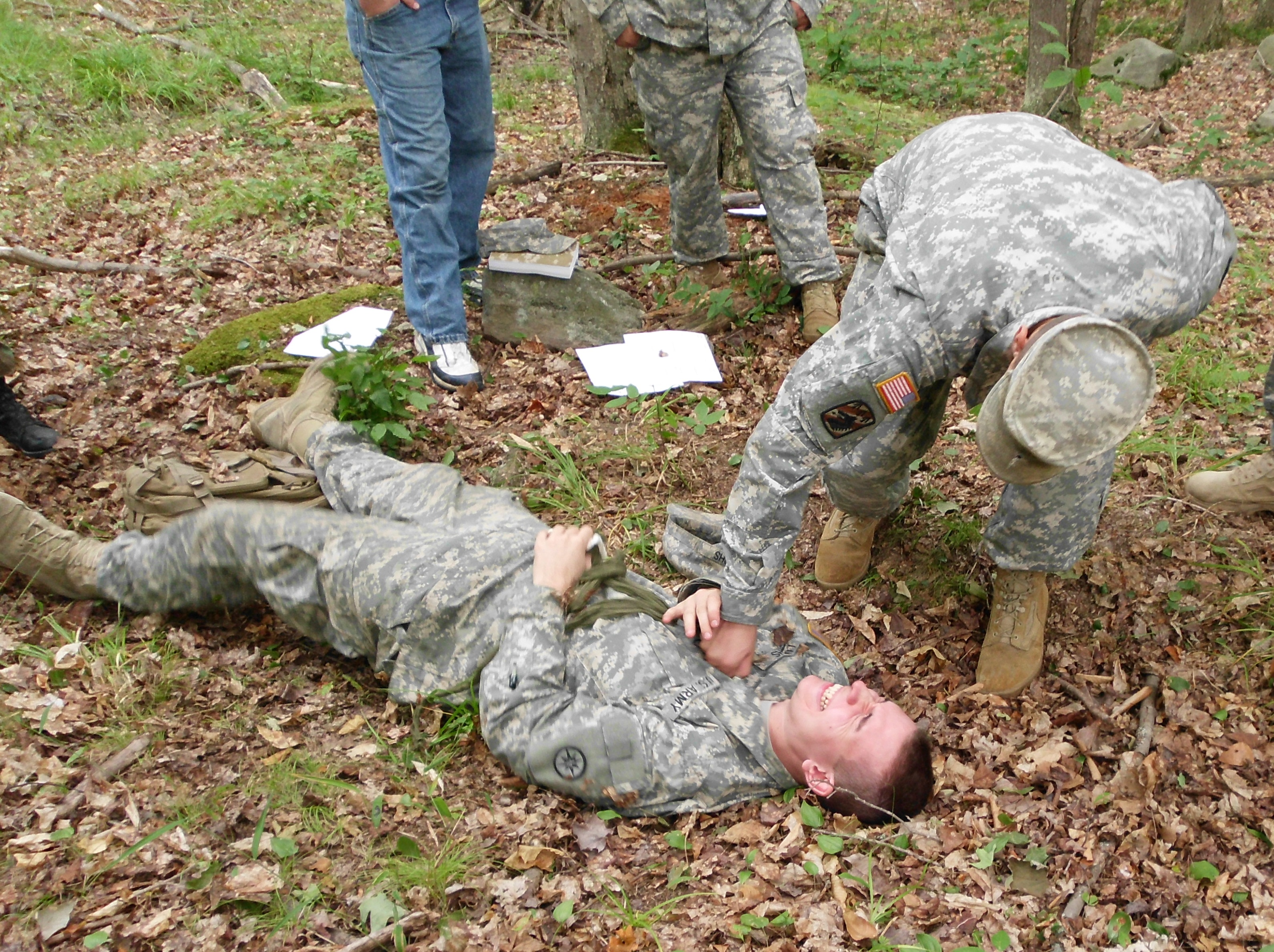
US Army soldiers demonstrating a sternal rub

A central stimulus is one which can only be successfully found if the brain is involved in the response to the pain (as opposed to peripheral stimuli, which can induce a result as a result of reflex. The four commonly used central pain stimuli are:

- the trapezius squeeze - which involves gripping and twisting a portion of the trapezius muscle in the patient's shoulder
- mandibular pressure - this is the manual stimulation of the mandibular nerve, located within the angle of the jaw
- supraorbital pressure - this is the manual stimulation of the supraorbital nerve by pressing a thumb into the indentation above the eye, near the nose.
- sternal rub - this involves creating a turning pressure (akin to a grinding motion with a pestle and mortar) on the patient's sternum

Central stimuli should always be used when attempting to assess if the patient is localising to pain (i.e. moving their arms to the site where the pain is being applied), however it has been suggested that central stimuli are less suitable for the assessment of eye opening, compared to peripheral stimuli, as they can cause grimacing. There is also a statistical reason behind central pain stimuli being inaccurate, especially regarding the GCS, which depending on the patient's eye response, the total score, and thus severity of patients' condition, can be altered with varying prognostic accuracy.

If the patient reacts to the central pain stimulus normally, then a peripheral stimulus is unlikely to be required, unless there is suspicion of localised paresthesia or paralysis in a particular limb.

Central stimuli are likely to have to be applied for at least 15 and potentially up to 30 seconds in order for the clinician to accurately assess their efficacy.

The various acceptable central stimuli have been criticised or deemed suboptimal for various reasons. For instance, the sternal rub may leave bruising (especially on fair skinned patients) and for this reason is discouraged by some.

It has been claimed that supraorbital pressure and trapezius squeeze are more effective than the sternal rub or peripheral stimulation, but sternal rub remains the most common.

Supraorbital and mandibular pressure may not be suitable for patients with head injuries, or those with periorbital swelling.

== Peripheral stimuli ==
Peripheral stimuli are generally applied to the limbs, and a common technique is squeezing the lunula area of the finger or toe nail, often with an adjunct such as a pen. Like the sternal rub, though, this can cause bruising, and is recommended against, in favour of squeezing the side of the finger.

== See also ==
- Glasgow Coma Scale
