= Apgar score =

Scale for the health of newborns

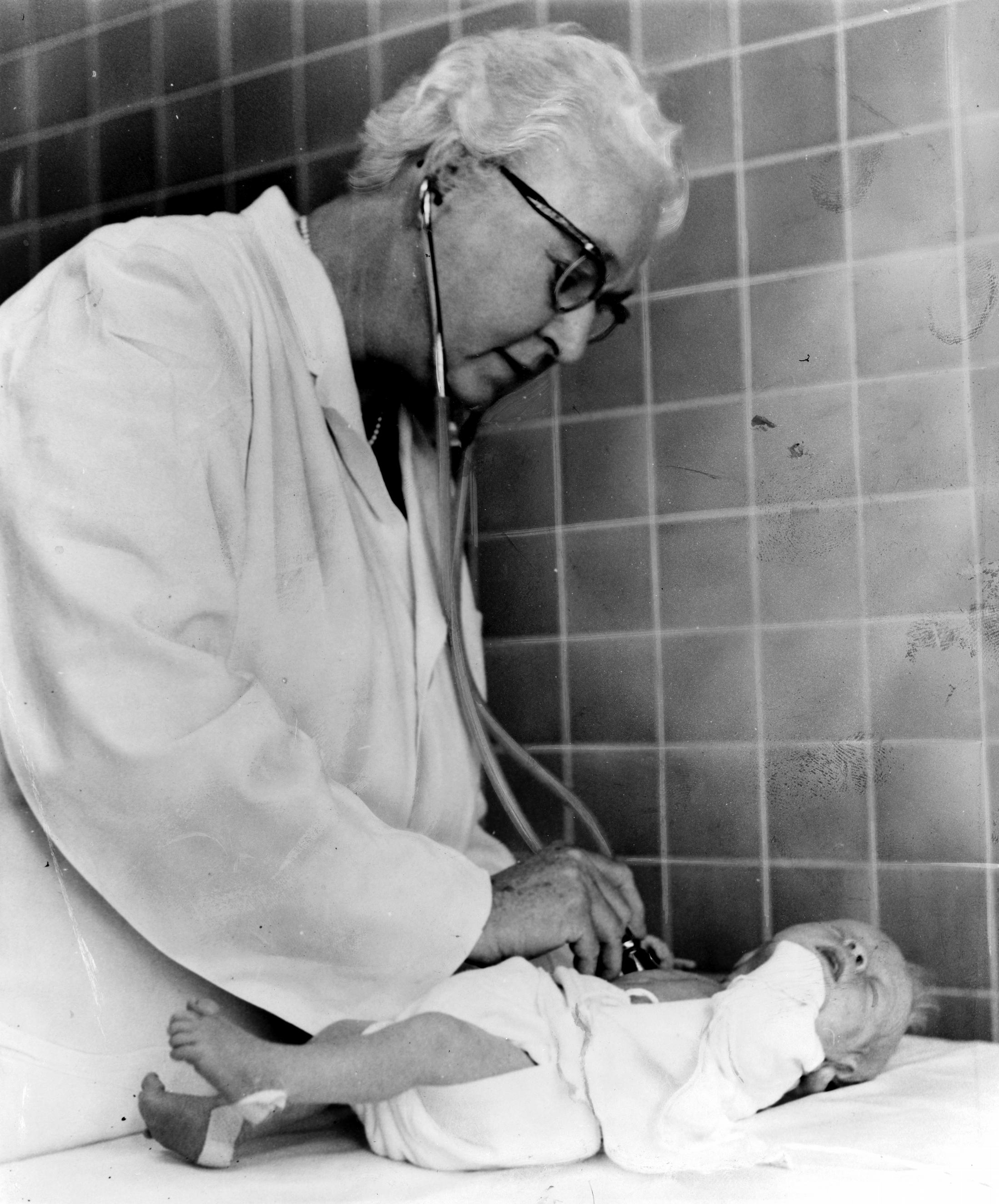
- Virginia Apgar, creator of the Apgar score

The Apgar score is a quick way for health professionals to evaluate the health of all newborns at one and five minutes after birth and in response to resuscitation. It was originally developed in 1952 by an anesthesiologist at Columbia University, Virginia Apgar, to address the need for a standardized way to evaluate infants shortly after birth.

Today, the categories developed by Apgar used to assess the health of a newborn remain largely the same as in 1952, though the way they are implemented and used has evolved over the years. The score is determined through the evaluation of the newborn in five criteria: appearance, pulse, grimace, activity (tone), and respiration. For each criterion, newborns can receive a score from 0 to 2. The list of criteria is a backronym of Apgar's surname.

== Criteria ==
The five criteria of the Apgar score:
	Score of 0	Score of 1	Score of 2
Appearance	blue or pale all over	blue at extremities, body pink (acrocyanosis)	no cyanosis body and extremities pink
Pulse	absent	< 100 beats per minute	≥ 100 beats per minute
Grimace (reflex irritability)	no response to stimulation	grimace or suction on aggressive stimulation	cry on stimulation
Activity (muscle tone)	none	some flexion	flexed arms and legs that resist extension
Respiratory effort	absent	weak, irregular, gasping	strong, robust cry

=== Interpretation ===
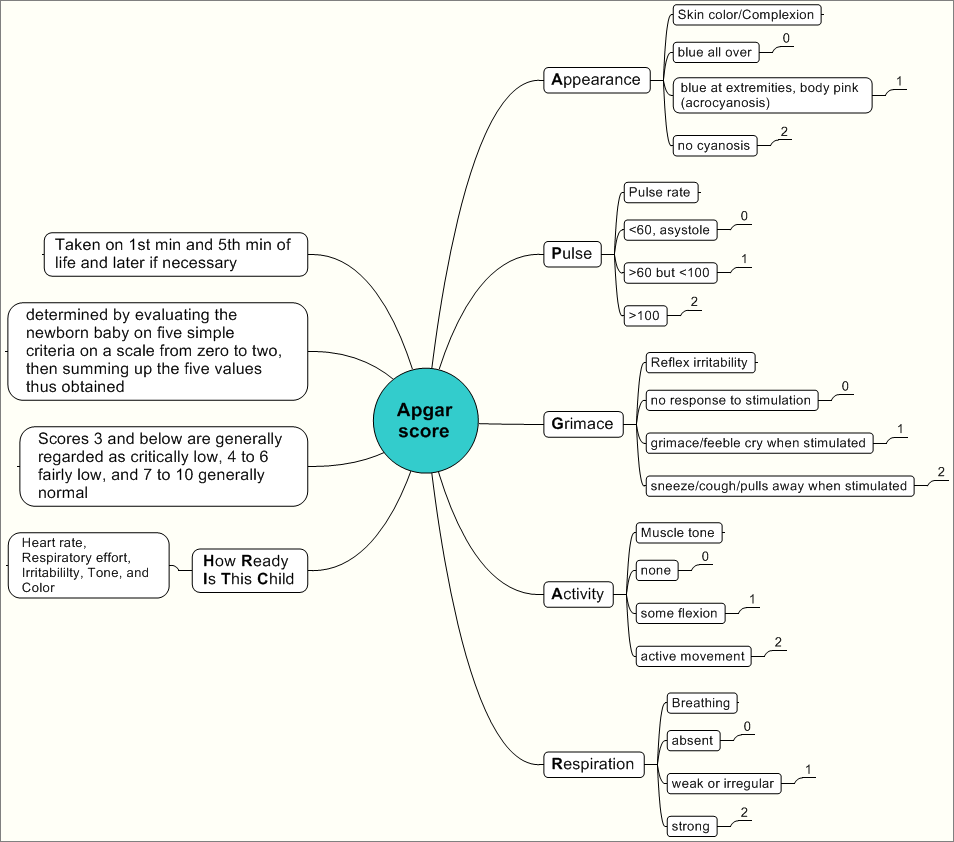
Mind map showing summary for the Apgar score

Various members of the healthcare team, including midwives, nurses, or physicians, may be involved in the Apgar scoring of a neonate. The test is generally done at one and five minutes after birth and may be repeated later if the score is and remains low. Scores of seven and above are generally normal; four to six, fairly low; and three and below are generally regarded as critically low and cause for immediate resuscitative efforts.

A low score on the one-minute mark may show that the neonate requires medical attention, but does not necessarily indicate a long-term problem, particularly if the score improves at the five-minute mark. A constellation of factors may contribute to a low Apgar score value. An Apgar score that remains below three at five minutes and later times, such as 10, 15, or 30 minutes, does not provide supporting evidence for a specific illness but can sometimes be among the first indicators of neonatal encephalopathy. However, the Apgar test's purpose is to determine quickly whether or not a newborn needs immediate medical care. It is not designed to predict long-term health issues.

A score of 10 is uncommon due to the prevalence of transient cyanosis, and does not substantially differ from a score of nine. Transient cyanosis is common, particularly in babies born at high altitude.

=== Implementation ===
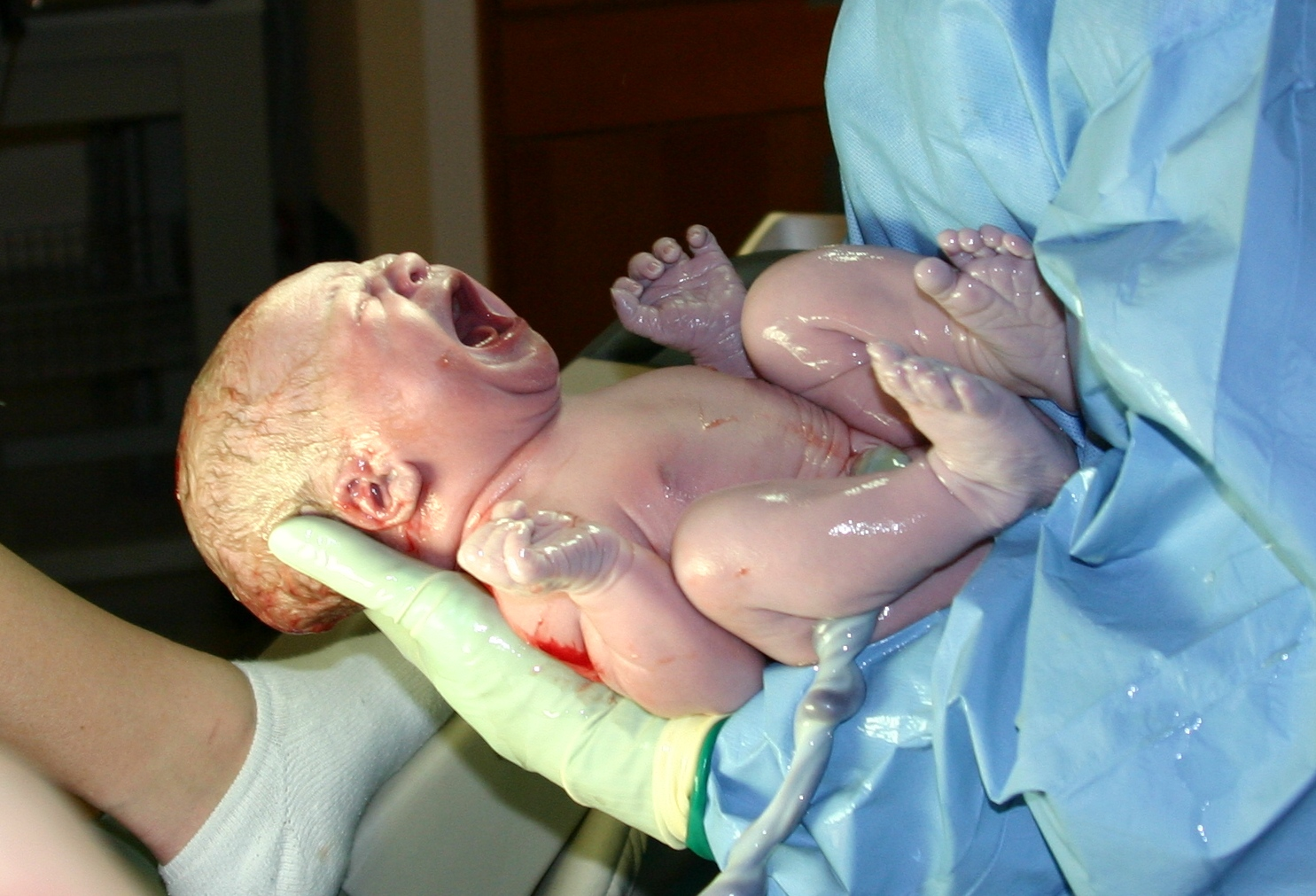
Newborn crying right after birth

In cases where a newborn needs resuscitation, it should be initiated before the Apgar score is assigned at the one-minute mark. Therefore, the Apgar score is not used to determine if initial resuscitation is needed, rather it is used to determine if resuscitation efforts should be continued. Variation between the one-minute and five-minute Apgar scores can be used to assess an infant's response to resuscitation. If the score is below seven at the five-minute mark, the Neonatal Resuscitation Program guidelines specify that the infant's Apgar score should be reassessed at five-minute intervals for up to 20 minutes.

Exceedingly few infants who have an Apgar score of 0 at 10 minutes of age survive with intact neurological function. As a result, the 2011 Neonatal Resuscitation Program suggests that if no pulse is appreciable at 10 minutes of life, "discontinuation of resuscitative efforts may be appropriate." However, in a 2019 retrospective study including 17 infants with an Apgar score of 0 at 10 minutes who received therapeutic hypothermia, 4 of the 8 surviving babies had no neurological abnormalities, and only one infant had severe abnormalities, as assessed through brain MRI.

During neonatal resuscitation, Apgar scores may not accurately represent the condition of the neonate as resuscitation measures (i.e. positive pressure ventilation and chest compressions) may artificially elevate scores. As a result, the American Academy of Pediatrics and the American College of Obstetricians and Gynecologists encourage the use of an expanded Apgar score report, which records resuscitation efforts utilized at each time point.

A systematic review that analyzed the relationship between umbilical cord pH and neonatal outcomes found that low cord pH is strongly correlated with mortality, morbidity and cerebral palsy in childhood. To reduce the risk of negative outcomes, it is recommended to obtain a sample of the umbilical artery blood gas when a newborn has an Apgar score of five or less at the five-minute mark.

Recognizing the importance of skin to skin contact (SSC), the World Health Organization (WHO), as part of the Baby Friendly Hospital Initiative, recommends that the Apgar score should be done while SSC is underway whenever possible. This recommendation was adopted by the American Academy of Pediatrics in 2009.

=== Limitations ===
Numerous factors contribute to the Apgar score, several of which are subjective. Examples of subjective factors include color, tone, and reflex irritability. Preterm infants may receive a lower score in these categories due to lack of maturity rather than asphyxia. Other factors that may contribute to variability among infants are birth defects, sedation of the mother during labor, gestational age, or trauma. Inappropriately using the Apgar score has led to errors in diagnosing asphyxia.

Various studies have shown that the Apgar score has variability between individual medical providers. One study was done in which several health care providers were assigned to give Apgar scores to the same infants. Results showed an Apgar score consistency of 55% to 82% between health care providers. Ideally, to limit variability and bolster consistency, the same individual determining the 1-minute and 5-minute Apgar scores is preferable.

A 2023 study of nine million babies found that non-white babies were given lower Apgar scores than white babies, as their darker skin color often results in lower scores on the appearance measure, making them more likely to receive medical care that might not be needed.

== History ==
Apgar originally developed the criteria as a way to address the lack of a standardized way to assess the need for assistive breathing procedures for newborns. In 1952, after some refinement of her initial system, Apgar presented the Apgar score at a joint meeting between the International Anesthesia Research Society and the International College of Anesthetists, and it was then published in Anesthesia & Analgesia in 1953.

In 1955, efforts to establish a scientific basis to the score increased. Alongside Duncan Holaday and Stanley James, Apgar published a research paper using the scores of 15,348 infants to establish the association between a low Apgar score (0-2) and laboratory findings characteristics of asphyxia.

The Apgar score is no longer used as a way to determine the need for newborn resuscitation because supportive measures must be implemented prior to one minute after birth, the first time the Apgar score is determined. The Apgar assessment, though, is endorsed by the American College of Obstetricians and Gynecologists and American Academy of Pediatrics.

== Acronym ==
Some 10 years after initial publication, a backronym for APGAR was coined in the United States as a mnemonic learning aid: Appearance (skin color), Pulse (heart rate), Grimace (reflex irritability), Activity (muscle tone), and Respiration.

- Spanish: Apariencia, Pulso, Gesticulación, Actividad, Respiración;
- Portuguese: Aparência, Pulso, Gesticulação, Atividade, Respiração;
- French: Apparence, Pouls, Grimace, Activité, Respiration;
- German: Atmung, Puls, Grundtonus, Aussehen, Reflexe, representing the same tests, but in a different but insignificant order (respiration, pulse, muscle tone, appearance, reflex).
- Czech: Adaptace kůže, Pulz, Grimasy, Aktivita svalů, Respirace;

Another eponymous backronym from Virginia Apgar's name is American Pediatric Gross Assessment Record.

Another mnemonic for the test is the initials from "How Ready Is This Child?", which summarizes the test criteria as heart rate, respiratory effort, irritability, tone, and color.

== See also ==
- Ballard maturational assessment
- Bishop score
- Glasgow coma scale (GCS)
- Midwifery
- Pediatric GCS
