= Portsmouth sign =

- Differential diagnosis: shock

Portsmouth sign refers to a situation in which the systolic blood pressure (SBP) reading (measured in mmHg) falls below that of the heart rate (HR) (measured in beats per minute). It typically signifies a worrying clinical prognosis, specifically caused by shock. The sign takes its name from physicians working at Portsmouth University who first described the sign in the context of hypotension.

Portsmouth sign is most often noted clinically when reviewing observations charts which often plot SBP and HR on the same axis, allowing direct observation of situations in which SBP falls below HR. Patients exhibiting this sign are likely to be significantly fluid depleted and in urgent need of aggressive fluid resuscitation. This sign is part of a number of "early warning" signs that can be used to promptly detect abnormal physiological states.

== See also ==
- Dehydration
- MEWS score
