= MET call =

Medical emergency call

The MET call (Medical Emergency Team) was designed at the Liverpool Hospital, Sydney, Australia in 1990 and has continued to develop and spread around the Western world as part of a Rapid Response System. The MET call is a hospital-based system, designed for a nurse (or other staff member) to alert and call other staff for help when a patient's vital signs have fallen outside set criteria. These criteria were designed around studies suggesting that certain vital sign ranges and symptoms occur before poor patient conditions which may lead to death (For example, Chest pain, a raise in heart rate and an elevated blood pressure may indicate the patient may be about to have a heart attack). In the original model, the criteria also include "and any patient you are seriously worried about", although this is not included in all hospitals despite some observational trials showing it is the most commonly used calling criteria in hospitals that use it.

MET calls may be triggered using vitals sign charts where patient observations breach certain parameters that represent severe deterioration. Triggers may relate to single parameter breaches (such as an extremely low blood pressure or a very fast heart rate), or from a combination of less severe abnormal vital signs that are cumulatively scored to identify a patient at high risk. Such systems are called MEWS or modified early warning score systems. Vital sign charts are often color-coded to aid both the calculation of MEWS and those patient that need a MET call.

The MET call is generally made by a phone call (e.g. to "switch"). On the ward it may be via an emergency button on the wall, which sounds a siren, and in some hospitals, a red light will begin flashing outside the patient’s room. Most staff are encouraged to attend and help as required.

Interventions and tests that the MET call may include: Oxygen (via a mask), Blood glucose levels, CPAP (Continuous positive airway pressure), X-ray, ECG, Vital signs, documentation and Spirometry.

Two to three trained professionals arrive at the room of the Emergency, and will work together with staff to assist the patient, as well as doctors, nurses and anyone who is able to help. Jobs are allocated including someone to record the nature of emergency and what they are doing to fix the problem. Some patients may be transferred to ICU post MET.

Implementation of the MET system has been controversial. It generally requires ICU medical and nursing staff to move beyond their traditional boundaries of control. It implies extra work, although arguably reduces the workload of patients arriving in ICU. Studies such as the MERIT study have been inconclusive and a source of ongoing controversy. Apart from clinical care implications, the MET system represents a political change within the hospital hierarchy, as it empowers nurses on the ward to summon help from senior critical care medical staff, rather than the traditional route of moving up the medical hierarchy starting with the intern. This political dimension of the MET system is not commonly discussed in scientific literature. Many institutions however already have 'Cardiac Arrest' or 'Code Blue' teams that are often activated by nursing staff. Utilising such a system earlier where rapid expert intervention may prevent continued decline culminating in arrest may be one way in which the team can be sold to a resistant medical hierarchy.
