= Coma scale =

System to assess the severity of coma

- Purpose: determine severity of coma

A coma scale is a system to assess the severity of coma. There are several such systems:

== Glasgow Coma Scale ==
The Glasgow Coma Scale is a neurological scale which aims to give a reliable, objective way of recording the conscious state of a person, for initial as well as continuing assessment. A patient is assessed against the criteria of the scale, and the resulting points give a patient score between 3 (indicating deep unconsciousness) and either 14 (original scale) or 15 (the more widely used modified or revised scale). GCS was initially used to assess level of consciousness after head injury and the scale is now used by first aid, EMS and doctors as being applicable to all acute medical and trauma patients. In hospital it is also used in chronic patient monitoring, in for instance, intensive care.

== Pediatric Glasgow Coma Scale ==
The Pediatric Glasgow Coma Scale (also known as Pediatric Glasgow Coma Score or simply PGCS) is the equivalent of the Glasgow Coma Scale (GCS) used to assess the mental state of adult patients. As many of the assessments for an adult patient would not be appropriate for infants, the scale was modified slightly. As with the GCS, the PGCS comprises three tests: eye, verbal and motor responses. The three values separately as well as their sum are considered. The lowest possible PGCS (the sum) is 3 (deep coma or death) whilst the highest is 15 (fully awake and aware person).

== Blantyre Coma Scale ==
The Blantyre Coma Scale is a modification of the Pediatric Glasgow Coma Scale, designed to assess malarial coma in children.

It was designed by doctors Terrie Taylor and Malcolm Molyneux in 1987, and named for the Malawian city of Blantyre, site of the Blantyre Malaria Project.

== Rancho Los Amigos Scale ==
The Rancho Los Amigos Scale is used to assess individuals after a closed head injury based on cognitive and behavioural presentations as they emerge from coma. It is named after the Rancho Los Amigos National Rehabilitation Center, located in Downey, California, United States.

== See also ==
- Level of consciousness
