= FOUR score =

Clinical grading scale

- Purpose: assessment of patients with impaired level of consciousness.

The FOUR Score is a clinical grading scale designed for use by medical professionals in the assessment of patients with impaired level of consciousness. It was developed by Dr. Eelco F.M. Wijdicks and colleagues in Neurocritical care at the Mayo Clinic in Rochester, Minnesota. "FOUR" in this context is an acronym for "Full Outline of UnResponsiveness".

The FOUR Score is a 17-point scale (with potential scores ranging from 0 - 16). Decreasing FOUR Score is associated with worsening level of consciousness. The FOUR Score assesses four domains of neurological function: eye responses, motor responses, brainstem reflexes, and breathing pattern.

The rationale for the development of the FOUR Score constituted creation of a clinical grading scale for the assessment of patients with impaired level of consciousness that can be used in patients with or without endotracheal intubation. The main clinical grading scale in use for patients with impaired level of consciousness has historically been the Glasgow Coma Scale (GCS), which cannot be administered to patients with an endotracheal tube (one component of the GCS is the assessment of verbal responses, which are not possible in the presence of an endotracheal tube).

The FOUR score has been validated with reference to the Glasgow Coma Scale in several clinical contexts, including assessment by physicians in the Neurocritical Care Unit, assessment by intensive care nurses, assessment of patients in the medical intensive care unit (ICU), and assessment of patients in the Emergency Department. Comparison of the inter-observer reliability of the FOUR Score and the GCS suggests that the FOUR Score may have a modest but significant advantage in this particular measure of test function.

Overall, FOUR score has better biostatistical properties than Glasgow Coma Scale in terms of sensitivity, specificity, accuracy and positive predictive value.

A 2024 systematic review found that the FOUR score was significantly more accurate than the Glasgow Coma Scale in predicting ICU mortality, based on higher area under the Receiver operating characteristic (AUROC) values. However, the generalisability of these findings remains uncertain: according to Schey et al. (2024), many studies included in their systematic review excluded sedated patients, and the authors identified limited clinical diversity and methodological quality as important limitations of the available evidence. The review also found the FOUR score to be more responsive in detecting clinically meaningful changes in patients with low levels of consciousness, as most patients with the lowest GCS score (GCS 3) had FOUR scores between 1 and 8 due to intact brainstem functions.

FOUR - Full Outline of UnResponsiveness
Points	Eye response	Motor response	Brainstem reflexes	Respiration
4	Eyelids open or opened, tracking, or blinking to command	Thumbs-up, fist, or peace sign	Pupil and corneal reflexes present	Not intubated, regular breathing pattern
3	Eyelids open but not tracking	Localizing to pain	One pupil wide and fixed	Not intubated, Cheyne–Stokes breathing pattern
2	Eyelids closed but open to loud voice	Flexion response to pain	Pupil or corneal reflexes absent	Not intubated, irregular breathing
1	Eyelids closed but open to pain	Extension response to pain	Pupil and corneal reflexes absent	Breathes above ventilator rate
0	Eyelids remain closed with pain	No response to pain or generalized myoclonus status	Absent pupil, corneal, and cough reflex	Breathes at ventilator rate or apnea

== See also ==
- Glasgow Coma Scale
- Level of consciousness
