= Ballard Maturational Assessment =

Ballard maturational assessment
- Synonyms: Ballard score, Ballard scale
- Purpose: Gestational age assessment

The Ballard maturational assessment, Ballard score, or Ballard scale, is a gestational age assessment technique. It was devised by Dr. Jeanne L. Ballard, professor emeritus of the Department of Pediatrics, Obstetrics, and Gynecology at the University of Cincinnati College of Medicine. It was developed in 1979.

The assessment scores various criteria, the sum of which is then extrapolated to the gestational age of the fetus. These criteria are divided into physical and neuromuscular criteria, which allows for the estimation of age in the range of 26 weeks to 44 weeks. The new Ballard score is an extension of the above to include extremely preterm babies, i.e., up to 20 weeks.

The scoring relies on the intrauterine changes the fetus undergoes during maturation. Whereas the neuromuscular criteria depend mainly upon muscle tone, the physical scale relies on anatomical changes. Neonate fetuses (less than 37 weeks of age) are in a state of physiological hypotonia, and since muscle tone increases throughout the fetal growth period, it can be used to identify fetal maturation.

== Neuromuscular criteria ==
- Posture – score the infant's posture from flexed to extended
- Square window – assess the flexibility of the wrist
- Arm recoil – measure the angle of recoil after extending arm
- Popliteal angle – measure the angle formed between knees during flexed extension
- Scarf sign – record the resistance while stretching the infant's arm across the chest
- Heel to ear – note the location of the heel when stretching the infant's leg toward the ear

== Physical criteria ==
Extended physical maturity assessment rubric
	−1	0	1	2	3	4	5
Skin	sticky, friable, transparent	gelatinous, red, translucent	smooth pink, visible veins	superficial peeling and/or rash, few veins	cracking, pale areas, rare veins	parchment, deep cracking, no vessels	leathery, cracked, wrinkled
Lanugo	none	sparse	abundant	thinning	bald areas	mostly bald	sparse
Plantar surface (Heel–toe)	40–50 mm	>50 mm, no crease	faint red marks	anterior transverse crease only	creases over anterior two-thirds of sole	creases over the entire sole	
Breast bud	imperceptible	barely perceptible	flat areola, no bud	stippled areola, 1–2 mm bud	raised areola, 3–4 mm bud	full areola, 5–10 mm bud	
Eye and ear	lids fused	lids open, pinna flat stays folded	slightly curved pinna, soft, slow recoil	well-curved pinna, soft but ready recoil	formed and firm, instant recoil	thick cartilage, ear stiff	
Genitals (male)	scrotum flat, smooth	scrotum empty, faint rugae	testes in upper canal, rare rugae	testes descending, few rugae	testes down, good rugae	testes pendulous, deep rugae	
Genitals (female)	clitoris prominent and labia flat	prominent clitoris and small labia minora	prominent clitoris and enlarging labia minora	labia majora and minora equally prominent	labia majora large, labia minora small	labia majora cover clitoris and minora	

== Scoring system ==
In the original Ballard score, each of the criteria is scored from 0 to 5. The scores were then ranged 5 to 50, with the corresponding gestational ages being 26 weeks and 44 weeks. A score increase of 5 advances the estimated age by 2 weeks. The new Ballard score allows scores of −1 for the criteria. The possible scores then range from −10 to 50, with the gestational range extending earlier to 20 weeks.

A simple formula to estimate age from the Ballard score is

age = (2 * score + 120) / 5

Maturity rating
Score	Weeks
-10	20
-5	22
0	24
10	28
15	30
20	32
25	34
30	36
35	38
40	40
45	42
50	44

== See also ==
- Apgar score
