= Dazzle reflex =

Type of reflex blink

Dazzle reflex is a type of reflex blink where the eyelids involuntarily blink in response to a sudden bright light (glare).

Neurological pathways for the dazzle reflex involve subcortical pathways, such as the supraoptic nucleus and superior colliculus.
