= Martha's Rule =

English patient safety initiative

Martha's Rule is a patient safety initiative implemented in English NHS hospitals from April 2024. It gives patients, families, carers and staff in hospitals who have concerns about a patient's deteriorating condition access to a rapid review from a critical care outreach team. Similar measures have been instituted in Australia, Denmark, Scotland and the United States, and a programme called Call 4 Concern had previously been trialled in the United Kingdom. Martha's Rule is also a "cultural intervention", which will help to flatten hierarchies within medicine, improve listening and openness on the part of clinicians and give patients and their families greater agency. In December 2024 the first phase of implementation of the rule in England was found to be already saving lives.

== Background ==
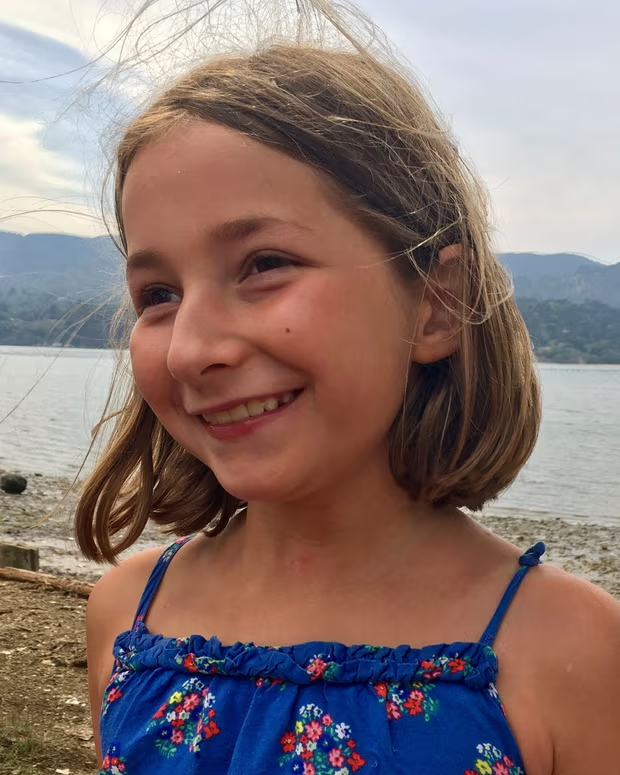
Martha Mills (2007–2021)

In the summer of 2021, 13-year-old Martha Mills fell off her bike, injuring her pancreas. She was admitted to King's College Hospital (KCH) in London, where she was under the care of the paediatric liver team. She remained on the ward as her condition deteriorated. She died of septic shock on 31 August 2021, a few days before her 14th birthday.

KCH's Serious Incident Investigation Report found that there were five occasions when it would have been appropriate to involve the paediatric intensive care unit (PICU). In 2022, a coroner ruled that Martha would have survived if KCH's liver team had transferred her to PICU, where a bed was available. KCH admitted a breach of its duty of care and apologised for mistakes made.

== Development of Martha's Rule ==
Martha Mills's mother, Merope Mills, is a journalist, editor of The Guardian Saturday magazine and a Guardian executive editor. In September 2022, Mills wrote about Martha and her treatment at KCH in an article for The Guardian. A year later, in September 2023, Mills gave an interview on the BBC Radio 4 Today programme, telling the story of Martha's treatment and making the case for Martha's Rule. Within a day of the broadcast, Martha's Rule was discussed in the House of Commons. Within two weeks both the Conservative and Labour parties supported the initiative. The then Shadow Secretary of State for Health, Wes Streeting, said that he was moved to tears by the BBC interview. Within two weeks, The Times, The Daily Telegraph, The Guardian and the Daily Mail had backed the campaign. The BMJ ran several pieces on Martha's Rule and its editor-in-chief wrote in support of the initiative.

In The Guardian Mills wrote that she and Martha's father, Paul Laity, had raised concerns about Martha's deterioration, but their opinions were ignored or dismissed by the consultants and resident doctors on Rays of Sunshine Ward at KCH. She recounted that Martha developed severe sepsis six days before she died, one symptom of which was that she bled copiously from the tubes in her arms and stomach. Despite this, the liver team kept her on the ward. Mills expressly voiced her fear that Martha would die of septic shock over the bank holiday weekend, when the ward consultants 'weren't around'. Mills and Laity were never told Martha had sepsis, and other symptoms were kept from them and left untreated. In attempting to explain the resistance to involving PICU in Martha's care, independent investigators commissioned by KCH said that it was 'ingrained in the culture' of the paediatric liver consultants that inviting an ICU doctor to look at Martha would have been 'a sign of weakness'. Martha developed a rash which was misdiagnosed, but when Mills raised a concern, she was told to 'trust the doctors'. The liver team failed to observe hospital protocol and take into account Mills's anxiety about her daughter. The failings of the KCH liver consultant responsible for Martha's treatment on the day of her rapid deterioration were, according to a medical tribunal in June 2025, 'particularly grave' and amounted to 'gross negligence'. He was 'categorical' that Martha should be kept on the ward, not moved to ICU. The consultant received no sanction. According to the former health minister James Bethell speaking on the Today programme, this absence of sanction despite gross negligence was 'very unusual these days...it's the old boys' network approach.' Henrietta Hughes, the Patient Safety Commissioner, has written that the 'tragic death of Martha is a clear example of epistemic injustice, where the views and voices of patients are not heard and acted on. The information and insights from Martha's parents were not believed, were undervalued, or were not understood – but it is not an isolated case.'

Following the significant public response to The Guardian's article, Mills and Laity were asked by the think-tank Demos to work jointly on a patient safety initiative designed to learn from Martha's death. After research and a meeting with NHS representatives and other health stakeholders, the decision was taken to concentrate on Martha's Rule. Mills had been approached by health workers in Australia, who told her about Ryan's Rule, a similar patient safety process in Queensland, Australia, which provided the inspiration for the name Martha's Rule. Martha's Rule also draws on Call 4 Concern, an initiative introduced in a number of British hospitals.

== Implementation ==
In September 2023, the then Secretary of State for Health and Social Care, Steve Barclay, asked Henrietta Hughes, the Patient Safety Commissioner, to work on an implementation plan for Martha's Rule. After four 'sprint' meetings involving NHS Trusts, the Health Ombudsman, the Care Quality Commission, the General Medical Council, the Patients Association and other bodies, Hughes submitted her recommendations to the Secretary of State on 20 October 2023. On 21 February 2024, NHS England and the Department of Health announced that the roll-out of Martha's Rule would begin with 100 hospitals from April 2024 to March 2025. These are hospitals that provide acute care and that already have round-the-clock critical care outreach capability. According to Victoria Atkins, the Secretary of State for Health, the 'introduction of Martha's Rule from April will put families at the heart of the patient's own care, recognising the critical role they have in the treatment of loved ones'. The work completed at the initial sites will inform the development of wider national policy proposals for Martha's Rule.

The three proposed components of Martha's Rule are:

1. All staff in NHS trusts must have 24/7 access to a rapid review from a critical care outreach team, who they can contact should they have concerns about a patient.
2. All patients, their families, carers, and advocates must also have access to the same 24/7 rapid review from a critical care outreach team, which they can contact via mechanisms advertised around the hospital, and more widely if they are worried about the patient's condition.
3. The NHS must implement a structured approach to obtain information relating to a patient's condition directly from patients and their families at least daily. In the first instance, this will cover all inpatients in acute and specialist trusts.

By December 2024 Martha's Rule was being used in 143 hospitals in a first phase, and had been invoked 573 times. 286 invocations led to an urgent review by critical care staff, and 57 led to care being escalated, sometimes by administration of potentially life-saving antibiotics or other medications. In a two-month period 14 patients were transferred to intensive care after Martha's Rule was invoked – potentially life-saving escalations that might otherwise not have occurred. The medical director of NHS England praised the impact already witnessed in the first phase.

== Response ==
On 2 April the General Medical Council, Nursing and Midwifery Council, and Care Quality Commission issued a joint statement expressing their support for the implementation of Martha's Rule by NHS England. The organisations stated that 'Martha's Rule reinforces the fundamental principles of listening to people who use health and care services and their families, and acting on what they say.'

Mills has argued that Martha's Rule will not only save lives but bring about a significant shift in the culture within hospitals towards patient power. Mills said of her experience at Martha's bedside: 'I was "managed", I hadn't been listened to and I felt powerless ... If a patient and family escalation system such as Martha's rule had existed – and had been clearly advertised around the hospital with posters and stickers – I'm sure I would have used it and it could well have saved Martha's life.' Mills called for an increase in patient and family agency in a hospital environment – something long supported in principle by the NHS. In February 2024 NHS England chief executive Amanda Pritchard said the programme would undoubtedly 'save lives in the future'.

Some doubts were expressed in advance of the implementation of Martha's Rule regarding any attempt to frame it as the 'right' to a second opinion, which would be 'practically and conceptually fraught'. It was also argued in the context of the initiative's aim to change medical culture that 'not all power imbalances' within the medical world 'are automatically and uniformly problematic'. In addition, 'requesting a second opinion exemplifies a lack of trust, and perhaps even distrust, in the clinical team'. In March 2024, the Royal College of Physicians and the British Medical Association (BMA) welcomed Martha's Rule. But Dr Vishal Sharma, chair of the BMA's consultants committee, argued that 'it is essential that the current workforce crisis is addressed so that critical care outreach teams have the necessary staff they need to deliver this initiative. More must also be done to embed a supportive culture across the NHS where staff know they can speak up about problems and have time to listen to families and others when issues arise.'

Evaluation of similar rules in other countries suggested that uses were not always related to patient safety. Calls to "Condition Help" in Pittsburgh were mostly regarding inadequate pain control, and most calls under Ryan's Rule in Australia did not lead to any change in clinical management. But a broad survey of evidence shows that initiatives such as Martha's Rule always improve communication; they are not overused or abused by patients or families, and result in necessary escalations which would otherwise not have occurred.

The initial implementation target was to enrol at least 100 sites, but due to significant interest from frontline clinicians this was expanded, so that the first phase of the Martha's Rule programme was in place at 143 locations across England by March 2025. The early results from September and October 2024 prompted the Secretary of State for Health, Wes Streeting, to state that it was having a 'transformative effect'. On 6 January 2025 the Prime Minister, Keir Starmer, discussed Martha's Rule during a speech on the NHS. He described it as being 'about a shift in the balance of power away from a passive deference to doctors and towards patients'; the lives of 'some of the sickest patients in our care' had been 'transformed, extended, saved'. In September 2025 NHS England announced that the initiative would be rolled out across all English hospitals delivering acute or short-term treatment. Since April 2024 there had been almost 5,000 calls, resulting in 241 potentially life-saving interventions. NHS England’s national medical director, Professor Meghana Pandit, said Martha's Rule was having 'a transformative impact' on how hospitals worked with patients and their families when their condition was worsening.

In May 2026 the NHS announced that Martha’s rule helplines received 12,301 calls between September 2024 and February 2026 from patients, relatives or staff. This led to 524 people receiving improvements to their care that may have saved their life: they were moved to intensive care, a high-dependency unit, a specialist hospital or a specialist ward. In June 2026, following a review into maternity services at Nottingham University Hospitals NHS Trust led by senior midwife Donna Ockenden, the NHS announced that Martha's Rule would be extended to all maternity units in England. Mills was awarded a CBE for patient safety in the King's birthday honours announced in June 2026. In March 2026 Mills said of Martha's Rule: 'The process is not being overused and has obviously met a need, giving patients and families real agency.' Wes Streeting said Mills and Laity had turned 'unimaginable grief' into 'lasting change'.
