= Corneal reflex =

Involuntary blinking of the eyelids

- Purpose: Examination of corneal reflex is part of some neurological tests.

The corneal reflex, also known as the blink reflex or eyelid reflex, is an involuntary blinking of the eyelids elicited by stimulation of the cornea (such as by touching or by a foreign body), though it could result from any peripheral stimulus. Stimulation should elicit both a direct and consensual response (response of the opposite eye). The reflex occurs at a rapid rate of 0.1 seconds. The purpose of this reflex is to protect the eyes from foreign bodies and bright lights (the latter known as the optical reflex). The blink reflex also occurs when sounds greater than 40–60 dB are made.

The reflex is mediated by:

- the nasociliary branch of the ophthalmic branch (V_{1}) of the trigeminal nerve (CN V) sensing the stimulus on the cornea only (afferent fiber).
- the temporal and zygomatic branches of the facial nerve (CN VII) initiating the motor response (efferent fiber).
- the center (nucleus) is located in the pons of the brainstem.

Use of contact lenses may diminish or abolish the testing of this reflex.

Flowchart depicting the corneal reflex pathway.

The optical reflex, on the other hand, is slower and is mediated by the visual cortex, which resides in the occipital lobe of the brain. The reflex is absent in infants under nine months.

The examination of the corneal reflex is a part of some neurological exams, particularly when evaluating coma, such as FOUR score. Damage to the ophthalmic branch (V_{1}) of the trigeminal nerve results in absent corneal reflex when the affected eye is stimulated. Stimulation of one cornea normally has a consensual response, with both eyelids normally closing.

== Rates ==
When awake, the lids spread the tear secretions over the corneal surface, on a typical basis of 2 to 10 seconds (though this may vary individually). However, blinking is not only dependent on dryness and/or irritation. A brain area, the globus pallidus of the basal ganglia, contains a blinking center that controls blinking. Nonetheless, the external stimuli are still involved. Blinking is linked with the extraocular muscles. Blinking is often concurrent with a shift in gaze, and it is believed that this helps the movement of the eye.

== See also ==
- Menace reflex
