= Arm recoil =

Neurological examination for determining muscle tone in newborns

- Purpose: Determining muscle tone in newborns

Arm recoil is a neurological examination of neonate for detecting the muscle tone.

== Procedure ==
The baby is placed supine, with forearm flexed at elbow. The elbow (forearm) is extended by pulling the hand; then released.

== Observation ==
How quickly the forearm returns to flexed original position and the amount of flexion will designate a score.

- Grade 0: Arms remain extended 180 degrees or abnormal movements begin
- Grade 1: Minimal flexion, 140-180 degrees
- Grade 2: Slight flexion, 110-140 degrees
- Grade 3: Moderate flexion, 90-110 degrees
- Grade 4: Quick return to full flexion, less than 90 degrees

== Conclusions ==
The greater the tone development (flexor tone), the brisker the recoil will be. This correlates to more advanced gestational age on the Ballard Scale.

Leg recoil can be assessed following the same principle.
