= Simplified Motor Scale =

- Purpose: neurological evaluation

Simplified Motor Scales (SMS) refer to a neurological evaluation that is designed to provide a meaningful, objective prognostic evaluation of an individual. SMS have been proposed as alternatives that would improve upon the Glasgow Coma Scale challenges of being confusing, unreliable and unnecessarily complex.

An example of a SMS can be remembered by the mnemonic "TROLL" for Test Responses: Obeys, Localizes, or Less.

The scale was created by Dr Stephen Green in 2011. He wrote an editorial for the Annals of Emergency Medicine strongly opposing the use of the GCS, stating that, compared to a general assessment, simple unstructured clinical judgement can be just as accurate and that the GCS itself has poor reliability. «Literature evidence is now overwhelming that the Glasgow Coma Scale is unreliable, inaccurate and unnecessarily complex, as simpler scales are just as predictable. SMS is a useful part of the GCS, statistically cleaned up to eliminate bloat and with much greater reliability between experts.» According to a study published in Annals of Emergency Medicine in 2014, an easier-to-use scale has little impact on the accuracy of diagnoses. The study was based on the prediction of the outcome of brain injuries: relative differences from the Glasgow Scale ranged from 3% to 7% with an average difference of 5%. Other studies have reached similar results.
