= Rapid response system =

Type of intervention in hospitals

A rapid response system (RRS) is a system implemented in many hospitals designed to identify and respond to patients with early signs of clinical deterioration on non-intensive care units with the goal of preventing respiratory or cardiac arrest. A rapid response system consists of two clinical components, an afferent component, an efferent component, and two organizational components – process improvement and administrative.

The afferent component consists of identifying the input early warning signs that alert a response from the efferent component, the rapid response team. Rapid response teams are those specific to the US, the equivalent in the UK are called critical care outreach teams, and in Australia are known as medical emergency teams, though the term rapid response teams is often used as a generic term. In the rapid response system of a hospital's pediatric wards a prequel to the rapid response team known as a rover team is sometimes used that continuously monitors the children in its care.

== Triggers ==
The afferent component, or identification limb, also known as the track-and-trigger system, uses standardized tools to track early signs of reversible clinical deterioration and trigger a call to, and response from the efferent component, or response limb. Examples of afferent tools include single-parameter calling criteria and multi-parameter early warning scores. These tools can predict clinical deterioration based upon the patient’s medical condition, and detect deterioration through the patient’s state such as a high respiratory rate. Single-parameter calling criteria require that only one criterion be met before activating the efferent component. Criteria may be based on vital signs, diagnoses, events, subjective observations, or concerns of the patient. Multi-parameter tools are more complex in that they combine several parameters into a single early warning score (EWS).

=== Family activation ===
METs were originally activated exclusively by bedside clinicians in need of emergency assistance. Recently, many hospitals have begun to allow families to activate a MET if they feel the care team is not adequately addressing their concerns. The team may differ in composition from the clinician-activated MET such as including a patient relations coordinator.

Family-activated METs were put in place as a response to the preventable death of Josie King in 2001. King was 18-months old when she died at Johns Hopkins Hospital in Baltimore, from medical errors and delays in escalation of care despite her family’s concerns. As a result of the highly publicized death, the Children’s Hospital of Pittsburgh began a program called Condition HELP that allows families to activate a MET. Families receive training on Condition HELP when the patient is admitted and are asked to voice concerns to their care team before activating the MET.

The Ryan's Rule initiative was trialled in some public hospitals in Queensland, Australia in 2013. It allows patients, their carers, friends and family to initiate a graduated escalation of care if they are concerned that the patient is not improving as expected. In 2016, Ryan's Rule was made available across all public hospitals in the Queensland Health system. Similar policies are called "REACH" in New South Wales and "CARE" in Australian Capital Territory.

Martha's Rule was introduced in NHS England hospitals from April 2024. It is initially being rolled out in 100 hospitals. It will allow patients, their families and carers, and hospital staff, to access a rapid review by the critical care outreach team if they are worried about the patient's condition.

== Response ==
The efferent component is a rapid response team – a multidisciplinary team trained in early resuscitation interventions, and advanced life support that rushes to the deteriorating patient’s bedside to prevent respiratory and cardiac arrest in order to improve the patient’s outcomes. The team is known in the US as a rapid response team (RRT), in the UK as a critical care outreach team (CCOT), and in Australia as a medical emergency team (MET), but rapid response team is also used generically.The team responds to calls placed by clinicians or families at the bedside who have detected deterioration. It may also provide proactive outreach to patients at high risk for deterioration. Composition of the teams may vary but often include one critical care attending physician or fellow, at least one nurse, and a respiratory therapist.

== Impacts and improvements ==
The process improvement component uses evidence-based evaluation of the RRS to determine its effectiveness and to improve the system through targeted interventions. It works closely with the administrative component, clinicians (especially those on RRTs), and quality improvement experts to evaluate three measures: outcomes measures, process measures, and balancing measures.

=== Outcomes measures ===
Rates of hospital-wide mortality and respiratory and cardiac arrest, which are exceedingly rare and may or may not be preventable, are common outcome measures. Rapid response teams appear to decrease the rates of respiratory and cardiac arrest outside the intensive care unit. They also appear to decrease the chance of death in hospital. Overall effectiveness of rapid response teams is somewhat controversial due to the variability across studies as is the overall effectiveness of the rapid response system in improving patient safety. More recent work uses proximal outcome measures, such as the Children’s Resuscitation Intensity Scale (measures level of care within 12 hours pre-transfer), the Clinical Deterioration Metric (measures level of care within 12 hours post-transfer), and UNSAFE transfers (measures level of care within 1 hour post-transfer).

=== Process measures ===
Process measures determine if the RRS is used as intended. Measures include the MET call rate, percentage of MET calls that result in transfer to the ICU, the time between initial physiologic abnormality and admission to ICU, timing of calls, reasons for MET calls, and evaluation of early warning scores using sensitivity and specificity.

=== Balancing measures ===
Balancing measures evaluate any unintended consequences of the RRS. Identified barriers to activating the MET include the primary team’s overconfidence in their ability to stabilize the patient, poor communication, hierarchal problems, and hospital culture. Interventions to overcome barriers include improved intradisciplinary staff education, protocol requiring activation when calling criteria are met, and use of “champions” to foster cultural change.

=== Administrative component ===
The administrative component oversees the planning, implementation, and maintenance phases for the RRS. A formal committee of frontline clinicians and ward and ICU leaders operate the administrative component. Cost effectiveness of RRS implementation has not been rigorously studied.

== History ==
Lee and colleagues developed the first reported MET in 1995 in Liverpool Hospital in Australia. The first pediatric RRS was implemented in 2005 by Tibballs, Kinney, and colleagues at Royal Children’s Hospital in Australia which included vital sign ranges that differed by age group. Since its development, the RRS has been implemented around the world. The RRS became a standard of hospitals in the U.S. after its promotion by the Institute for Healthcare Improvement in 2005 and the Joint Commission in 2008. Outside the U.S., RRS implementation has been encouraged and adopted by several national organizations, such as the Ministry of Health and Long-term Care in Canada, the UK National Institute for Health and Clinical Excellence, and the Australian Commission on Safety and Quality in Healthcare.
