= Menace response =

The menace response is one of three forms of blink reflex. It includes the reflexive blinking that occurs specifically in response to the rapid approach of an object. The menace response comprises blinking of the eyelids, in order to protect the eyes from potential damage, but may also include turning of the head, neck, or even the trunk away from the optical stimulus that triggers the response.

Stimulating the menace response is used as a diagnostic procedure in veterinary medicine, in order to determine whether an animal's visual system, in particular the cortical nerve, has suffered from nerve damage. Cortical damage, particularly cerebral lesions, can cause loss of the menace response while leaving the other blink reflexes, such as the dazzle reflex, unaffected. The presence or absence of the menace response, in combination with other reflexes, indicates a locus of damage. For example, an animal with polioencephalomalacia will lack the menace reflex, but will still have the pupillary light reflex. Polioencephalomacia damages the visual cortex, impairing the menace response, but leaves the optic nerve, oculomotor nucleus, and oculomotor nerve intact, leaving the pupillary light reflex unaffected. Contrastingly, an animal with ocular hypovitaminosis-A will suffer from degeneration of the optic nerve, and such an animal presents with a lack of both reflexes.

Care must be taken when testing the menace response. Waving an object close to an animal's eyes or face does not necessarily demonstrate a functioning menace response, in part because the animal can sense such objects and react to them via senses other than sight. Clinical testing of the menace response usually involves precautions such as waving an object from behind a sheet of glass, so as to shield the animal from any drafts caused by the motion of the object through the air, which it might otherwise sense. Such reactions to non-visual stimuli are a widespread cause of false positives and false negatives when pet owners test their own animals for the presence of the menace response.

The neural pathway of the menace response comprises the optic (II) and facial (VII) nerves. It is mediated by tectobulbar fibres in the rostral colliculi of the midbrain passing from the optic tract to accessory nuclei, and thence to the spinal cord and lower motor neurones that innervate the head, neck, and body muscles affected by the response. The facial nerve is mediated through a corticotectopontocerebellar pathway.
