= Edwarda O'Bara =

American woman who spent 42 years in coma

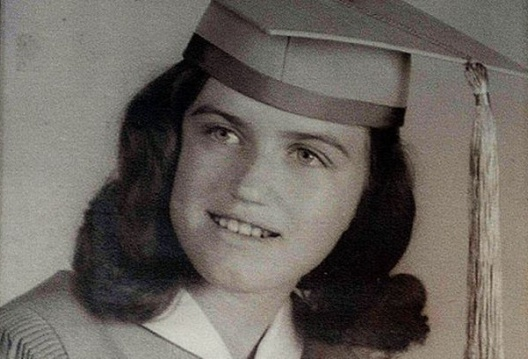
- High school photo of Edwarda O'Bara
- Born: March 27, 1953; Johnstown, Pennsylvania, U.S.
- Died: November 21, 2012 (aged 59); Miami Gardens, Florida, U.S.
- Other name: "Florida's sleeping Snow White"

Edwarda O'Bara (March 27, 1953 – November 21, 2012) was an American woman who spent 42 years in a diabetic coma starting in January 1970 after contracting pneumonia in December 1969.

== Early life and family ==
O'Bara was born in Johnstown, Pennsylvania, to Joe O'Bara and Kathryn "Kaye" McCloskey. She was named after Kaye's father Edward McCloskey, a mayor of the latter town during the 1930s. Joe was a halfback at the University of Pittsburgh in 1952, was the Middleweight Boxing champion for the U.S. Navy during World War II, and went on to become a physical education teacher. Kaye was a high school math teacher. She also had a younger sister, Colleen.

== Illness and care ==
O'Bara contracted pneumonia on December 20, 1969, at 16 years old. Her condition worsened over a period of two weeks and she was taken to a hospital. According to her family, at 3 a.m. on January 3, 1970, O'Bara "woke up shaking and in great pain because the oral form of insulin she had been taking wasn't reaching her blood stream". The date was significant for the family as it was her parents' 22nd wedding anniversary. Her family rushed her to the hospital, where she slipped into a diabetic coma. Before losing consciousness, Edwarda asked her mother, Kaye O'Bara, to never leave her side. She was fed from a tube and Kaye turned her from side to side every two hours to prevent bedsores. Kaye also read, played music, and made conversation with her. Her father Joe also gave up his job to care for her. By 2007, the costs of O'Bara's care had put her mother into debt by $200,000. Joe had a heart attack in 1972 and died in 1976 at the age of 50. Kaye died in 2008 at the age of 81. After Kaye's death, Edwarda continued to be cared for by her sister.

== Death ==
O'Bara died at her home in Miami Gardens, Florida on November 21, 2012, at the age of 59. Thousands of people from around the world subsequently visited the O'Bara family home.
