= Paediatric Glasgow Coma Scale =

Neurological scale for recording the conscious state of an infant

- Synonyms: Pediatric Glasgow Coma Score
- Purpose: assess the level of consciousness of child

The Paediatric Glasgow Coma Scale (British English) or the Pediatric Glasgow Coma Score (American English) or simply PGCS is the equivalent of the Glasgow Coma Scale (GCS) used to assess the level of consciousness of child patients. As many of the assessments for an adult patient would not be appropriate for infants, the Glasgow Coma Scale was modified slightly to form the PGCS. As with the GCS, the PGCS comprises three tests: eye, verbal and motor responses. The three values separately as well as their sum are considered. The lowest possible PGCS (the sum) is 3 (deep coma or death) whilst the highest is 15 (fully awake and aware person). The pediatric GCS is commonly used in emergency medical services.

In patients who are intubated, unconscious, or preverbal, the motor response is considered the most important component of the scale.

== Coma scale ==
Pediatric Glasgow Coma Scale
	1	2	3	4	5	6
Eyes	Does not open eyes	Opens eyes in response to painful stimuli	Opens eyes in response to speech	Opens eyes spontaneously	N/A	N/A
Verbal	No verbal response	Inconsolable, agitated	Inconsistently inconsolable, moaning	Cries but consolable, inappropriate interactions	Smiles, orients to sounds, follows objects, interacts	N/A
Motor	No motor response	Extension to pain (decerebrate response)	Abnormal flexion to pain for an infant (decorticate response)	Infant withdraws from pain	Infant withdraws from touch	Infant moves spontaneously or purposefully

Any combined score of less than eight represents a significant risk of mortality. A score of 12 or below indicates a severe head injury. A score of less than 8 indicates that intubation and ventilation may be necessary. A score of 6 or below indicates that intracranial pressure monitoring may be necessary.

== Modified Glasgow Coma Scale for Infants and Children ==
Modified Glasgow Coma Scale for Infants and Children
Area Assessed	Infants	Children	Score
Eye opening	No response	No response	1
	Open in response to pain only	Open in response to pain only	2
	Open in response to verbal stimuli	Open in response to verbal stimuli	3
	Open spontaneously	Open spontaneously	4
Verbal response	No response	No response	1
	Moans in response to pain	Incomprehensible words or nonspecific sounds	2
	Cries in response to pain	Inappropriate words	3
	Irritable cries	Confused	4
	Coos and babbles	Oriented, appropriate	5
Motor response	No response	No response	1
	Responds to pain with decerebrate posturing (abnormal extension)	Responds to pain with decerebrate posturing (abnormal extension)	2
	Responds to pain with decorticate posturing (abnormal flexion)	Responds to pain with decorticate posturing (abnormal flexion)	3
	Withdraws in response to pain	Withdraws in response to pain	4
	Withdraws to touch	Localizes painful stimulus	5
	Moves spontaneously and purposefully	Obeys commands	6

== See also ==
- Apgar score
