= Bodily function =

Bodily functions can refer to one of the following:

- The functions (i.e. processes) of human or animal bodies, called "systems" in physiology.
- A euphemism for urination or defecation
- Bodily Functions (album)
