= Glasgow Coma Scale =

Behavioral diagnostic scale for assessing the level of brain damage

- MeSH: D015600
- LOINC: 35088-4

The Glasgow Coma Scale (GCS) is a clinical diagnostic tool widely used since the 1970s to assess a patient's level of consciousness. While initially primarily utilized in patients with traumatic brain injuries, its utilization has extended to assess the level of consciousness in a wide range of settings, illnesses, and injuries. The GCS score takes into consideration three components: eye movements, verbal response (e.g., speech), and motor response (e.g. purposeful body movements). A GCS score can range from the lowest possible score of 3, in which a patient is completely unresponsive and is associated with a state of coma, to the best score possible of 15, in which a patient is fully alert and interactive. An initial score is used to guide immediate medical care after traumatic brain injury (such as a car accident) and a post-treatment score can monitor hospitalised patients and track their recovery.

The total GCS score is not recommended to be used by itself to predict patient outcomes.

== Scoring ==
The Glasgow Coma Scale is used for people above the age of two and is composed of three tests: eye, verbal, and motor responses. The scores for each of these tests are indicated in the table below.

Glasgow Coma Scale
Test	Not Testable (NT): Examples	1	2	3	4	5	6
Eye (ocular response)	Severe trauma to the eyes, enucleation	Does not open eyes	Opens eyes in response to pain (Note: A peripheral pain stimulus, such as squeezing the lunula area of the person's fingernail, is more effective than a central stimulus such as a trapezius squeeze, as the latter tends to make the patient close their eyes and grimace instead.)	Opens eyes in response to voice	Opens eyes spontaneously	N/A	N/A
Verbal (oral response)	Intubation, non-oral language disability, linguistic barrier	Makes no sounds	Incomprehensible sounds	Inappropriate words	Confused and disoriented, but able to answer questions	Oriented to time, person, and place, converses normally	N/A
Motor (motoric response)	Paralysis/hemiparesis (acquired causes such as post-stroke, post-neurological injury; congenital/innate such as cerebral palsy)	Makes no movements	Abnormal extension (decerebrate posture) (Note: Different guidelines report different evaluation of abnormal extension. While some sources indicate extension at the elbow is sufficient, other sources use the language "decerebrate posturing". The original publication of the Glasgow Coma Scale explicitly avoided the term "decerebrate extension" because it implied specific anatomical findings.)	Abnormal flexion (decorticate posture)	Flexion / Withdrawal from painful stimuli	Moves to localise pain	Obeys commands

The Glasgow Coma Scale is reported as the combined score (which ranges from 3 to 15) and the score of each test (E for eye, V for Verbal, and M for Motor). For each test, the value should be based on the best response that the person being examined can provide.

For example, if a person obeys commands only on their right side, they get a 6 for motor. The scale also accounts for situations that prevent appropriate testing (Not Testable). When specific tests cannot be performed, they must be reported as "NT" and the total score is not reported.

The results are reported as the Glasgow Coma Score (the total points from the three tests) and the individual components. As an example, a person's score might be: GCS 12, E-3 V-4 M-6. In a patient who is intubated with an endotracheal tube and unable to speak, but fully conscious, their GCS score breakdown would be: GCS E-3, V-1T, M-6. In a patient who is both intubated and sedated, they will likely have lower eye and motor component scores in addition to their verbal score of V-1T (e.g., GCS E-2, V-1T, M-5).

== Pediatric scoring ==
Children below the age of two struggle with the tests necessary for assessment of the Glasgow Coma Scale. As a result, a version for children has been developed, and is outlined below.

Pediatric Glasgow Coma Scale
Test	Not Testable (NT) Examples	1	2	3	4	5	6
Eye	Severe trauma to the eyes	Does not open eyes	Opens eyes in response to pain	Opens eyes in response to sound	Opens eyes spontaneously	N/A	N/A
Verbal	Intubation	Makes no sounds	Moans in response to pain	Cries in response to pain	Irritable/Crying	Coos/Babbles	N/A
Motor	Paralysis	Makes no movements	Extension to painful stimuli (decerebrate response)	Abnormal flexion to painful stimuli (decorticate response)	Withdraws from pain	Withdraws from touch	Moves spontaneously and purposefully

== Interpretation ==
Individual elements as well as the sum of the score are important. Hence, the score is expressed in the form "GCS 9 = E2 V4 M3 at 07:35". Patients with scores of 3 to 8 are usually considered to be in a coma. Generally, traumatic brain injury is classified as:

- Severe, GCS ≤ 8
- Moderate, GCS 9–12
- Minor, GCS ≥ 13.

Tracheal intubation and severe facial/eye swelling or damage make it impossible to test the verbal and eye responses. In these circumstances, the score is given as 1 with a modifier attached (e.g. "E1c", where "c" = closed, or "V1t" where t = tube). Often the 1 is left out, so the scale reads Ec or Vt. A composite might be "GCS 5tc". This would mean, for example, eyes closed because of swelling = 1, intubated = 1, leaving a motor score of 3 for "abnormal flexion".

Many people have difficulty remembering the difference between decorticate and decerebrate posturing. One way to remember the difference is by remembering, deCOREticate means arms are flexing inwards towards the body. You can also remember that deCEREbrate posturing has a lower score (meaning it is worse), by thinking of the E's and remembering extension for decerebrate, and extreme for bad.

Special considerations:

Potential non-traumatic underlying causes of decreased responsiveness include toxins, metabolic derangements (e.g. high or low temperature, high or low glucose, high or low electrolytes), infections, stroke, and seizures.

Baseline patient characteristics that may affect GCS include language barriers, hearing difficulty, speech difficulty, and pre-existing intellectual or neurological abnormalities.

Other injuries such as eye or facial trauma, extremity (arm, leg) trauma, or spinal cord injuries can also affect the GCS.

Elderly patients warrant special consideration as they are at risk for under-triage from relatively minor injuries, such as a fall from standing. Providers should have higher concern for an underlying severe injury in this patient population even if their initial GCS is high or near normal. As such, age and frailty are being recognized as important factors to consider in conjunction with GCS.

The GCS has limited applicability to children, especially below the age of 36 months (when the verbal performance of even a healthy child would be expected to be poor). Consequently, the Paediatric Glasgow Coma Scale was developed for assessing younger children.

== History ==
=== Pre-GCS assessment ===
During the 1960s, assessment and management of head injuries became a topic of interest. The number of head injuries was rapidly increasing, in part because of increased use of motorised transport. Also, doctors recognised that after head trauma, many patients had poor recovery. This led to a concern that patients were not being assessed or medically managed correctly. Appropriate assessment is a critical step in medical management for several reasons. First, a reliable assessment allows doctors to provide the appropriate treatment. Second, assessments let doctors keep track of how a patient is doing, and intervene if the patient is doing worse. Finally, a system of assessment allows researchers to define categories of patients. This makes it possible to determine which treatments are best for different types of patients.

A number of assessments for head injury ("coma scales") were developed, though none were widely adopted. Of 13 scales that had been published by 1974, all involved linear scales of abnormal or impaired ability. These scales posed two problems. First, the categories or levels of impairment in these scales were often poorly defined, which made it difficult for doctors and nurses to evaluate head injury patients. Second, different scales used overlapping and obscure terms that made communication difficult. Third, many of the scales that were used prior to the development of GCS were impractical to perform at the bedside for frequent reassessments. There was a clear need for a simple, standardized tool to improve communication, which would also help advance research and clinical management.

=== Origin ===
In this setting, Bryan Jennett and Graham Teasdale of the University of Glasgow Medical School began work on what became the Glasgow Coma Scale. Based on their experiences, they aimed to make a scale satisfying several criteria: (1) it needed to be simple, so that it could be performed without special training; (2) it needed to be reliable, so that doctors could be confident in the results of the scale; (3) the scale needed to provide important information for managing a patient with a head injury; and (4) it needed to be a bedside assessment that could be performed frequently.

Their work resulted in the 1974 publication of the first iteration of the GCS. The original scale involved three exam components (eye movement, motor control, and verbal control). These components were scored based on clearly defined behavioural responses. Clear instructions for administering the scale and interpreting results were also included. The original scale is identical to the current scale except for the motor assessment. The original motor assessment included only five levels, combining "flexion" and "abnormal flexion". This was done because Jennett and Teasdale found that many people struggled in distinguishing these two states. In 1977, abnormal flexion was separated from normal flexion, resulting in the six levels of the motor assessment that exists today. Today, it is used to assess levels of consciousness in both traumatic brain injuries and non-traumatic conditions.

=== Updates to the Glasgow Coma Scale ===
In 1976, Teasdale updated the motor component of the Glasgow Coma Scale to differentiate flexion movements. This was because trained personnel could reliably distinguish flexion movements. Further research also demonstrated that normal and abnormal flexion have different clinical outcomes. As a result, the six-point motor scale is now considered the standard.

Teasdale did not originally intend to use the sum score of the GCS components. However, later work demonstrated that the sum of the GCS components, or the Glasgow Coma Score, had clinical significance. Specifically, the sum score was correlated with outcome (including death and disability). As a result, the Glasgow Coma Score is used in research to define patient groups. It is also used in clinical practice as shorthand for the full scale.

=== Adoption in clinical use ===
The Glasgow Coma Scale was initially adopted by nursing staff in the Glasgow neurosurgical unit. Especially following a 1975 nursing publication, it was adopted by other medical centres. True widespread adoption of the GCS was attributed to two events in 1978. First, Tom Langfitt, a leading figure in neurological trauma, wrote an editorial in Journal of Neurosurgery strongly encouraging neurosurgical units to adopt the GCS score. Second, the GCS was included in the first version of Advanced Trauma Life Support (ATLS), which expanded the number of centres where staff were trained in performing the GCS. Currently, the GCS remains an important part of the xABCDE approach to evaluation of a trauma patient in the 11th (2025) edition of ATLS, with "D" standing for disability and is assessed using the GCS.

== Controversy ==
The GCS has come under pressure from some researchers who take issue with the scale's poor inter-rater reliability and lack of prognostic utility. Additionally, there has been a call for alternatives to the GCS due to its several limitations: 1) all components are affected by sedation, 2) the verbal component is not testable in patients who are intubated, and 3) brainstem reflexes are not able to be assessed. Although there is no agreed-upon alternative, newer scores such as the Simplified Motor Scale and the Full Outline of Unresponsiveness Score (FOUR score) have also been developed as improvements to the GCS. The FOUR score was specifically created in such a way as to overcome the limitations of GCS. Importantly, like GCS, the FOUR score is not intended to be used alone in predicting patient outcomes. Although the inter-rater reliability of these newer scores has been slightly higher than that of the GCS, they have not yet gained consensus as replacements. Recent literature also suggests that the FOUR score may be especially advantageous in the intensive care unit (ICU) due to its potential ability to overcome the limitation of decreased patient responsiveness (for example when a patient is getting sedating medications).

== See also ==
- AVPU scale
- Blantyre coma scale
- Early warning score
- Revised Trauma Score
- Triage
