= Early warning system (medical) =

Clinical deterioration detection system

Early warning systems
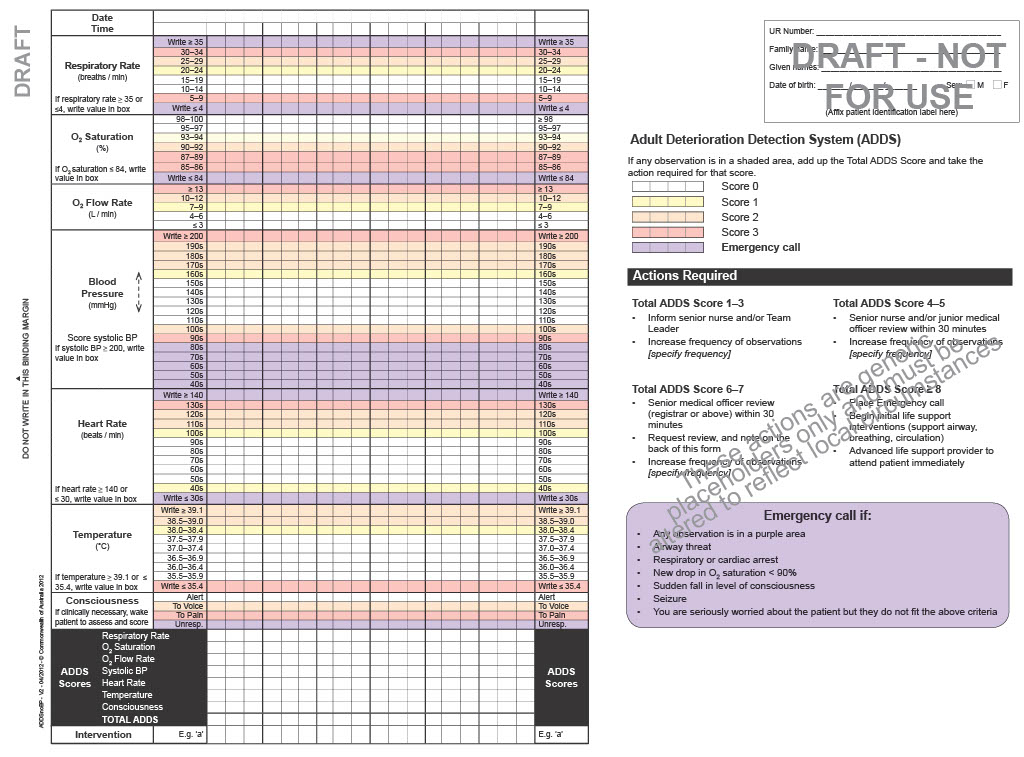
- A sample of an Adult Deterioration Detection System designed for Australia
- Synonyms: ADDS; NEWS
- Reference range: Physiological normal observations will generate a score of zero
- Purpose: to predict the risk of an adverse event or patient deterioration
- Test of: variation in physiological measures

An early warning system (EWS), sometimes called a between-the-flags or track-and-trigger chart, is a clinical tool used in healthcare to anticipate patient deterioration by measuring the cumulative variation in observations, most often being patient vital signs and level of consciousness. EWSs emerged in the 1990s with research finding deterioration was often preceded by abnormal vital signs. Early warning systems are heavily utilised internationally with some jurisdictions mandating their use.

Early warning systems are principally designed to identify a deteriorating patient earlier, allowing for early interventions and the prevention of adverse outcomes. EWS scores give a standardised classification to the degree of physiological abnormality, with higher scores representing a higher risk of deterioration.

== History ==
The first recorded EWS was developed by a team in James Paget University Hospital, Norfolk, United Kingdom, and presented at the May 1997 conference of the Intensive Care Society.

With the growth in electronic health records, many services have implemented EWS systems in their digital platforms.

== Design and impact ==
Early warning systems are typically designed based on statistical analysis of the degree of variation in any given observation (such as vital signs, consciousness or demographics), and corresponding associations with adverse events (such as ICU admission, cardiac arrest, or death). The most common observations utilised in EWSs to predict deterioration is respiratory rate, followed by heart rate, oxygen saturation, temperature, systolic blood pressure, then level of consciousness (either AVPU or GCS). A small number of EWSs include age and sex as predictors of deterioration, as both have associations with in-hospital mortality, however the benefit of including age is negligible and raises significant ethical concerns. Most EWSs are designed to generate a score of up to three for any one given measure. Further delimitation of variation beyond 3 in either direction is believed to not add any additional benefit with the increased complexity.

EWSs generate an overall score intended to indicate the risk of a patient experiencing an adverse outcome, such as requiring ICU admission, cardiac arrest, or in-hospital death. As physiological observations go outside normal parameters, numeric scores are assigned for the severity of variation. The sum of these scores across all measures is the EWS score, with scores of certain values requiring an escalation of care (such as urgent review by senior clinicians or medical emergency team activation). The inclusion of criteria requiring mandatory escalation is the source of the 'track and trigger' nickname. Some EWSs include both single-parameter MET criteria (such as sudden loss of consciousness, threat to airway patency, severe tachypnoea) and composite criteria (e.g., a cumulative score of >5).

Throughout the world the EWS is based on the principle that clinical deterioration can be seen through changes in multiple physiological measurements, as well as large changes within a single variable. However, the scale is calibrated to different populations and sometimes expanded to include additional parameters, specific to different parts of the world. The parameters scored may vary, as well as the weighting of the scores for worsening deterioration. Some systems also assign scores to other parameters including urine output, oxygen saturation, flow rate of oxygen administration and pain scores.

There is a lack of consensus on what constitutes the 'ideal' early warning score system. Comparing different systems in clinical use shows variation in which parameters are scored and how those scores are assigned to differing levels of deterioration. There is however some evidence that certain parameters are better at predicting which patients will die within 24 hours than others. This has led to a call in several countries for the development of a national early warning score that would allow a standardised approach to assessing and responding to deteriorating patients.

Australian psychological research has found clinician preference for graduated colouring for each measure. Chart design, such as the use of colours, has a statistically significant effect on the speed and accuracy of identifying abnormal observations. Clinicians prefer EWSs charts that have greater ease of interpretation rather than ease of recording data. Additionally, EWSs charts have been designed to only include the most important observations for detecting deterioration, as additional observations complete with clinician attention and increase the level of effort required (and potential error rate).

An example of an early warning system is the VitalPAC Early Warning System (ViEWS), designed in 2010 in response to a recommendation for a national EWS by the UK National Institute for Health and Care Excellence. The ViEWS chart is:

VitalPAC Early Warning System
Observation	3	2	1	0	1	2	3
Heart rate (bpm)		<41	41-50	51-90	91-110	111-130	>130
Respiratory rate (bpm)	<9		9-11	12-20		21-24	>24
Temperature (°C)	<35.1		35.1-36.0	36.1-38.0	38.1-39.0	>39.1	
Systolic blood pressure (mmHg)	<92	91-100	101-110	111-249	>250		
Oxygen saturation (SpO2%)	<92	92-93	94-95	>95			
Oxygen requirements				Air only			Any supplemental oxygen
Level of consciousness (AVPU)				Alert (A)			Verbal (V) Pain (P) Unresponsive (U)

A ViEWS score of 5 or higher was found to be associated with an approximate 82% incidence of death within 24 hours for patients in a Medical Assessment Unit where ViEWS was developed.

Recent changes have also included non-specific nursing concern in EWSs. Research suggests that nursing staff are able to identify subtle changes in patient condition before physiological deterioration, with many EWSs explicitly stating that an absence of physiological variation does not preclude escalation of care due to nursing staff's concern. Many of the 'trigger' statements (i.e., the criterion for changes to care) in EWSs reference serious worry about a patient as cause for escalation.

Some EWSs allow for modifications to the scoring pattern to allow for individual differences and stable pathologies. For example, the Queensland Adult Deterioration Detection System includes "Modified Calling Criteria" that allow senior medical officers to authorise changes to the normal observation ranges for a patient.

== Criticism ==
Despite their wide utilisation, there has been little research into the clinical utility of EWSs. Some studies have however found that most EWSs have little clinical effectiveness, potentially due to poor design and implementation. A 2021 Cochrane review of EWSs found that there is only low certainty in the quality of research on these systems, and that the evidence may indicate little to no difference in patient outcomes; no recommendations could be concluded in either regard.

A 2021 study of the Queensland Adult Deterioration Detection System (Q-ADDS) found that while the system was only able to predict approximately half of the patients in a rural or remote hospital who experienced deterioration. Compared to the National Early Warning Score from the UK, Q-ADDS had a higher rate of prediction of deterioration (46.5% Q-ADDS vs 40.8% NEWS) but a higher rate of false-positives (3.2:1 Q-ADDS vs 2.4:1 NEWS).

The efficacy of EWSs in improving patient outcomes is also reliant on a number of personal and structural factors. For example, a lack of clinician knowledge of the EWS, incomplete or incorrect vital sign measurement, and the influence of power between nursing and medical staff hinder detection of clinical deterioration.

== Early warning system implementations ==
=== United Kingdom ===
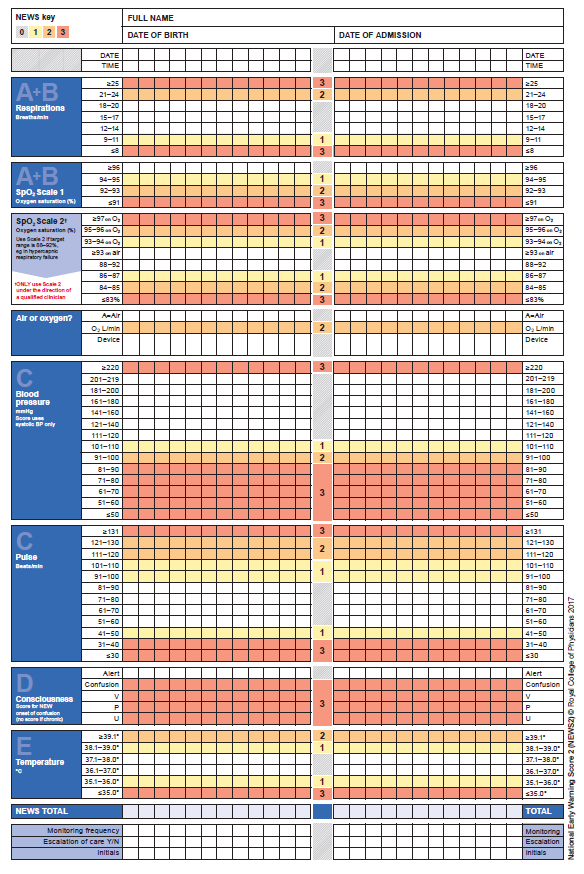
NEWS2 chart

A range of Early Warning Scores have been developed in response to the needs of specific patient types (e.g. PEWS for children) or to support local best practice (NEWS in the UK).

Name	Acronym	Description
Paediatric Early Warning Score	PEWS	Designed to support the use of Track and Trigger with patients under 16, who have different normal ranges for observations
Modified Early Obstetric Warning Score	MEOWS	Designed to support the use of Track and Trigger for all women receiving care from maternity services
Modified Early Warning Score	MEWS	Modified to meet the requirements of many people in various clinical situations.
National Early Warning Score	NEWS & NEWS2	Developed by the Royal College of Physicians to provide a national standard in the UK for Early Warning Scores (2012 and 2017)

In the UK, the Royal College of Physicians developed the National Early Warning Score (NEWS) in 2012 to replace local or regional scores. The NEWS score is the largest national EWS effort to date and has been adopted by some international healthcare services.

A second version of the score was introduced in 2017. The revised version was optimised for the identification of sepsis, alternative oxygen targets in people with underlying lung disease, and the onset of delirium. Additional implementation guidance was issued in March 2020. While many hospitals still use other scores, it has been proposed that all healthcare organisations should use the same score, plus clinical judgement, for diagnosis in the interest of patient safety. Clinical judgment should always be applied as a patient can deteriorate whilst presenting a score of zero. A score of zero does not indicate a stable set of vital signs. Research suggests this patient score can predict worsening condition in care home residents, and that the score could be used in care home settings as well as in hospitals.

=== Australia ===
Standard 8 of the National Safety and Quality Health Service (NSQHS) Standards is Recognising and Responding to Acute Deterioration, which centres on the early detection of deterioration and escalation of care. Action 8.4 of the standard explicitly states that health services are to "graphically document and track changes in agreed observations to detect acute deterioration over time, as appropriate for the patient", and outlines the minimum observations to be taken of all patients. The implementation advise specifically recommends the use of track and trigger charts (also called observation and response charts) to monitor patient physiological status, and encourages the use of digital EWS to improve early detection where properly implemented.

The Australian Commission on Safety and Quality in Health Care has also released the National Consensus Statement: Essential elements for recognising and responding to acute physiological deterioration. The statement reiterates the recommendation for track and trigger charts in Australian public and private hospitals, and includes specialist charts that include lactate measurements for sepsis pathway patients.

==== Queensland ====
Queensland Health has developed a range of observation charts used by most public hospitals in the state of Queensland, Australia, designed to meet the requirements of Action 8.4 of the NSQHS Standards. A very small number of Queensland Health facilities have their own EWS charts in use. The family of charts includes:

- the Queensland Adult Deterioration Detection System (Q-ADDS), with variations for certain care pathways and rural and remote facilities,
- the Queensland Maternity Early Warning Tool (Q-MEWT), which has variations for antenatal and postnatal patients,
- the Queensland Children's Early Warning Tool (Q-CEWT), which has variations depending on the specific child's age,
- the Queensland Neonatal Early Warning Tool (Q-NEWT).

Q-ADDS was developed as a research project by the University of Queensland for Queensland Health to standardise 25 existing observation charts. The chart was designed primarily from The Prince Charles Hospital's observation chart (which was an adaptation of Canberra Hospital's observation chart) and the Children's Early Warning Tool by the Royal Children's Hospital, Brisbane.

Q-ADDS has been shown to be able to predict deterioration approximately half of the time, however no other EWS has shown any marked improvement in accuracy over Q-ADDS.

== See also ==
- Glasgow Coma Scale
- Triage
