= Walking wounded =

Triage term for low priority individuals

In first aid and triage, the walking wounded are injured persons who are of a relatively low priority. These patients are conscious and breathing and will often have only relatively minor injuries; thus they are capable of walking. Depending on the resources available, and the abilities of the injured persons, walking wounded may sometimes be called upon to assist treatment of more seriously injured patients or assist with other tasks.

In most mass casualty situations, the walking wounded are the largest category of casualty.

== Classification ==
According to Simple Triage and Rapid Treatment (START) documentation, walking wounded are determined by requesting those on the scene who may self-evacuate, to do so immediately to a designated refuge. Any casualties able to respond to this command and move themselves to the designated position are considered walking wounded.

According to the Revised Trauma Score (RTS) system of triaging, walking wounded can be considered to be those scoring a 12.
