= JumpSTART triage =

Method of triage used for children during a mass-casualty event

The JumpSTART pediatric triage MCI triage tool (usually shortened to JumpSTART) is a variation of the simple triage and rapid treatment (START) triage system. Both systems are used to sort patients into categories at mass casualty incidents (MCIs). However, JumpSTART was designed specifically for triaging children in disaster settings. Although JumpSTART was initially developed for use with children from infancy to age 8, where age is not immediately obvious, it is used in any patient who appears to be a child (patients who appear to be young adults are triaged using START).

JumpSTART was created in 1995 by Dr. Lou Romig, a pediatric emergency and disaster physician working at Miami Children's Hospital. After seeing the effects of Hurricane Andrew on the pediatric population, Dr. Romig became interested in pediatric disaster medicine and developed the JumpSTART tool, which was modified in 2001.

== Triage categories ==
Like START, JumpSTART sorts patients into four categories:

Immediate: Life-threatening injury; needs medical attention within the next hour

Delayed: Non-life-threatening injuries; needs medical attention, but treatment can be delayed a few hours

Minor: Minor injuries; may need medical attention in the next few days ("the walking wounded")

Deceased or expectant: Deceased, or injuries so severe that life-saving treatment cannot be provided with the resources available

== The JumpSTART algorithm ==
=== Step 1: Identify ambulatory patients ===
As with START, the triage clinician begins by instructing everyone who can walk to move to a designated area for treatment. All patients who can do this are immediately tagged green (minor). A clinician assigned to the green area will provide further evaluation (secondary triage).

In the JumpStart system, infants are evaluated first in secondary triage, using the entire JumpStart algorithm. Other children who could not walk independently but were carried to the treatment area, are evaluated next.

=== Step 2: Is the patient breathing? ===
==== Yes ====
If the patient is breathing, the clinician proceeds to step 3.

==== No ====
As with START, an airway maneuver is first attempted. If the child starts breathing on their own, they are triaged red (immediate).

However, unlike START, patients who do not have a spontaneous return of respirations following an airway maneuver are not immediately triaged Black. First the clinician feels for a peripheral pulse. If the child is apneic with no peripheral pulse, they are triaged black (deceased/expectant).

If the child does have a palpable peripheral pulse, the clinician delivers five assisted ventilations. If the child remains apneic, they are triaged black. If the child has a return of spontaneous respirations, they are triaged red.

=== Step 3: Assess respiratory rate, perfusion, and mental status ===
The child is triaged red if:

- Their respiratory rate is under 15, or over 45; or
- They have no peripheral pulse; or
- Their mental status is age-inappropriate
  - Mental status is assessed using the AVPU scale. Age-inappropriate mental statuses include inappropriate responses to pain or unresponsiveness
  - Age-inappropriate mental status also includes posturing

To be triaged yellow, the child must:

- Have a respiratory rate between 15 and 45; and
- Have a palpable peripheral pulse; and
- Have an age-appropriate mental status (A, V, or P on the AVPU scale)

== Literature review ==
As of 2016, no studies have assessed JumpSTART's validity or reliability in actual mass-casualty settings, though its discriminant validity has been established. Within the medical literature, the existing studies of JumpSTART generally examine its use in training or simulated MCI settings.

Several studies have found that medical providers easily learn the JumpSTART algorithm. For example, a study involving prehospital and nursing personnel found that participants improved their ability to triage pediatric patients, which was maintained over 3 months after training ceased. Similarly, a 2013 study found that medical residents in all postgraduate years easily learned the JumpSTART algorithm, with high inter-rater reliability in individual patient triage decisions. However, reliability was high in patients with head injuries but lower for ambulatory patients.

In simulated pediatric mass casualty incidents, JumpSTART performed equally as well as SALT triage, which has been proposed as a new national standard for mass-casualty triage. However, JumpSTART was significantly faster than SALT, requiring eight seconds less per patient.

Conversely, a 2006 study by two physicians from a South African emergency department critiqued the JumpSTART system. This study examined how four different tools would have performed if used to triage pediatric patients that presented at the authors' emergency department. The authors compared the START and JumpSTART systems with two other pediatric triage tools: the Pediatric Triage Tape and Care Flight. The study reported:

None of the tools showed high sensitivity and specificity... [T]he JumpSTART and START scores had very low sensitivities, which meant that they failed to identify patients with serious injury and would have missed the majority of seriously injured casualties in the models of major incidents.

Further study is needed to evaluate JumpSTART's validity and reliability, particularly in real-life patient settings.

== See also ==
- START triage
- RPM-30-2-Can Do (mnemonic for START and JumpSTART)
- Triage
- Mass casualty incident
