= RPM-30-2-Can Do =

Mnemonic for triage

RPM-30-2-Can Do is a mnemonic device for the criteria used in the START triage system, which is used to sort patients into categories at a mass casualty incident. The mnemonic is pronounced "R, P, M, thirty, two, can do."

== Mnemonic for adult triage ==
Using the START system, GREEN (MINOR) patients are easily identified by their ability to walk to a designated treatment area when told to do so immediately after the first responders' arrival.

Deceased patients are easily identified by apnea with no return of spontaneous respirations when their airway is repositioned. These patients are triaged BLACK (EXPECTANT/DECEASED).

"RPM-30-2-Can do" helps responders differentiate between the other two triage categories: YELLOW (DELAYED) and RED (IMMEDIATE). "30, 2, Can Do" stands for the criteria that delineate these two categories:

- Respirations: Is the patient's respiratory rate over 30 per minute?
- Perfusion: Is capillary refill over or under 2 seconds?
- Mental status: Is the patient able to follow simple commands (the patient can do what you ask them to)?

To be triaged YELLOW (DELAYED) , the patient must meet all of these criteria:

R	30	Respiratory rate is under 30 per minute.
P	2	Perfusion is adequate, indicated by capillary refill under 2 seconds.
M	Can Do	Mental status is adequate, indicated by the patient's ability to follow simple commands (the patient can do what they are asked)

If any one of these criteria are not met, the patient is triaged RED (IMMEDIATE).

== Inclusion of pediatric criteria ==
An alternative version of this mnemonic is RPM-30-2-Can Do-15-45. The "15-45" at the end refers to the different respiratory criteria in the pediatric JumpSTART triage system, due to the differences between children's and adults' normal respiratory rates.

In pediatric patients:

- Children who are breathing under 15 times a minute are RED.
- Children who are breathing over 45 times a minute are RED.

The remainder of the criteria are the same as those specified in the adult acronym, except that an apneic child is given five assisted ventilations before being triaged Black. A child who starts breathing on their own after five ventilations is triaged RED; a child without spontaneous return of respirations is triaged BLACK.

== See also ==
- START triage
  - Respiratory rate
  - Perfusion
  - Mental status
- Mass casualty incident
