= Triage tag =

Tool for triaging victims of accidents

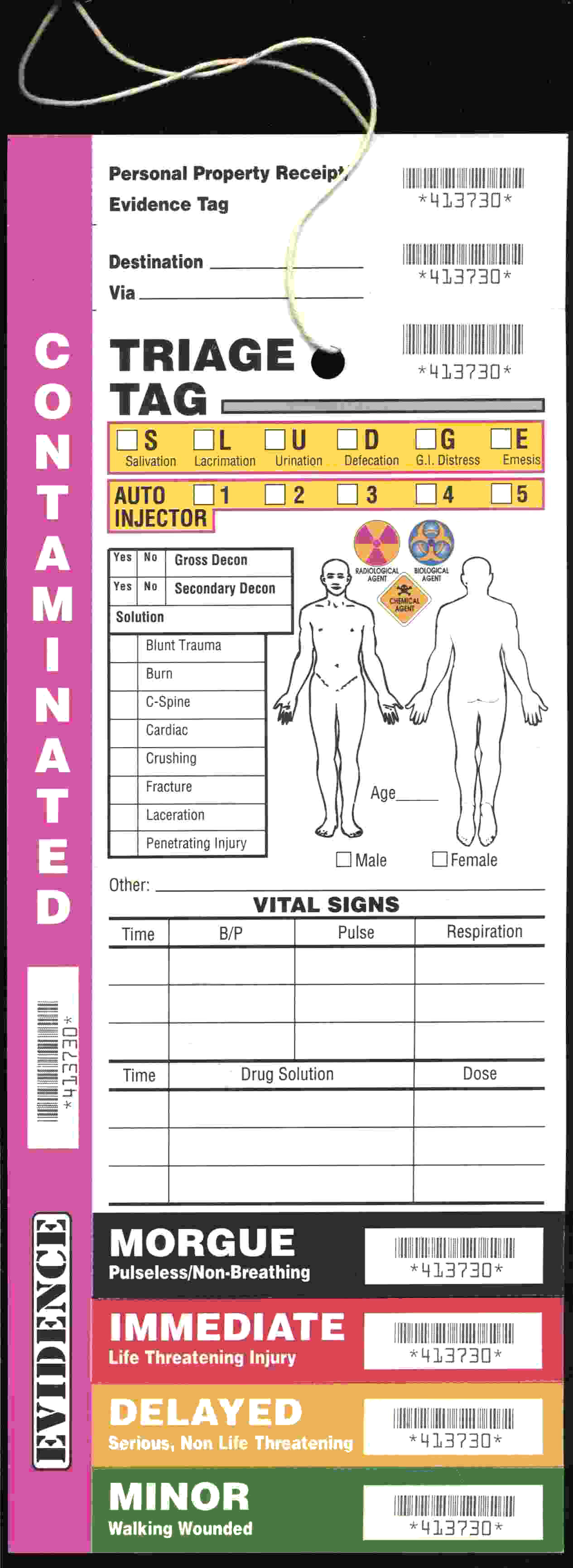
Typical triage tag used for emergency mass casualty decontamination.

A triage tag is a tool first responders and medical personnel use during a mass casualty incident. With the aid of the triage tags, the first-arriving personnel are able to effectively and efficiently distribute the limited resources and provide the necessary immediate care for the victims until more help arrives. Triage tags were first introduced by Baron Dominique Jean Larrey, a French surgeon in Napoleon's army.

Simple triage and rapid treatment (START) is a strategy that the first responders and medical personnel employ to evaluate the severity of injury of each victim as quickly as possible and tag the victims in about 30–60 seconds. The triage tags are placed near the head and are used to better separate the victims so that when more help arrives, the patients are easily recognizable for the extra help to ascertain the most dire cases.

== Design ==
A triage tag is two-sided, but the actual layout of the sections vary between and within countries and between governmental agencies. Design is often in the form of a fold-able card, to allow the state of the victim to be clearly visible. It is now common to use triage tags to allow first responders to have a better handle of the victims during a triage. There is no universal agreement in the design of triage tags, so each authority has implemented their own version to meet their needs.

=== Dynamic ===
Popular triage tags, including Cruciform and the Smart Tag, allow casualties to be re-triaged without having to replace the tag.

=== Standard sections ===
Typically, the basic sections of a triage tag may include:

- A section informing medical personnel of the patient's vital signs along with the treatment administered.
- A section on the patient's demographics such as gender and residential address, and the patient's medical history.
- A section with a full pictorial view of the human body. The medical personnel indicate which parts of the body are injured.
- The four colors of triage:

Black	Expectant	Pain medication only, until death
Red	Immediate	Life-threatening injuries
Yellow	Delayed	Non-life-threatening injuries
Green	Minimal	Minor injuries

Other features may include:

- tear off sections to label the victim properly in terms of severity of injury and to inform other medical personnel, that may arrive later, of the victim's status.
- main body for the first responders to fill out during their assessment of the patient. This portion will stay with the patient.
- peel off stickers to keep a record of what transportation or treatment was provided to the victim.

=== Benefits ===
A benefit in using the triage tag, besides improved traffic flow and effectively distributed care among injured patients, is data collection and dissemination. The fill-in slots on the triage tags do not need to be filled out all at once. Information can be obtained and added onto the triage tag throughout the triage, and referred to as needed.

If a patient's medical condition changes while still in triage, medical personnel can simply tag the patient again with the updated information and label the tags sequentially. The other option is to use a tag which can be altered so that the priority level can go up or down. This eliminates the need to re-tag the patient.

=== Examples ===
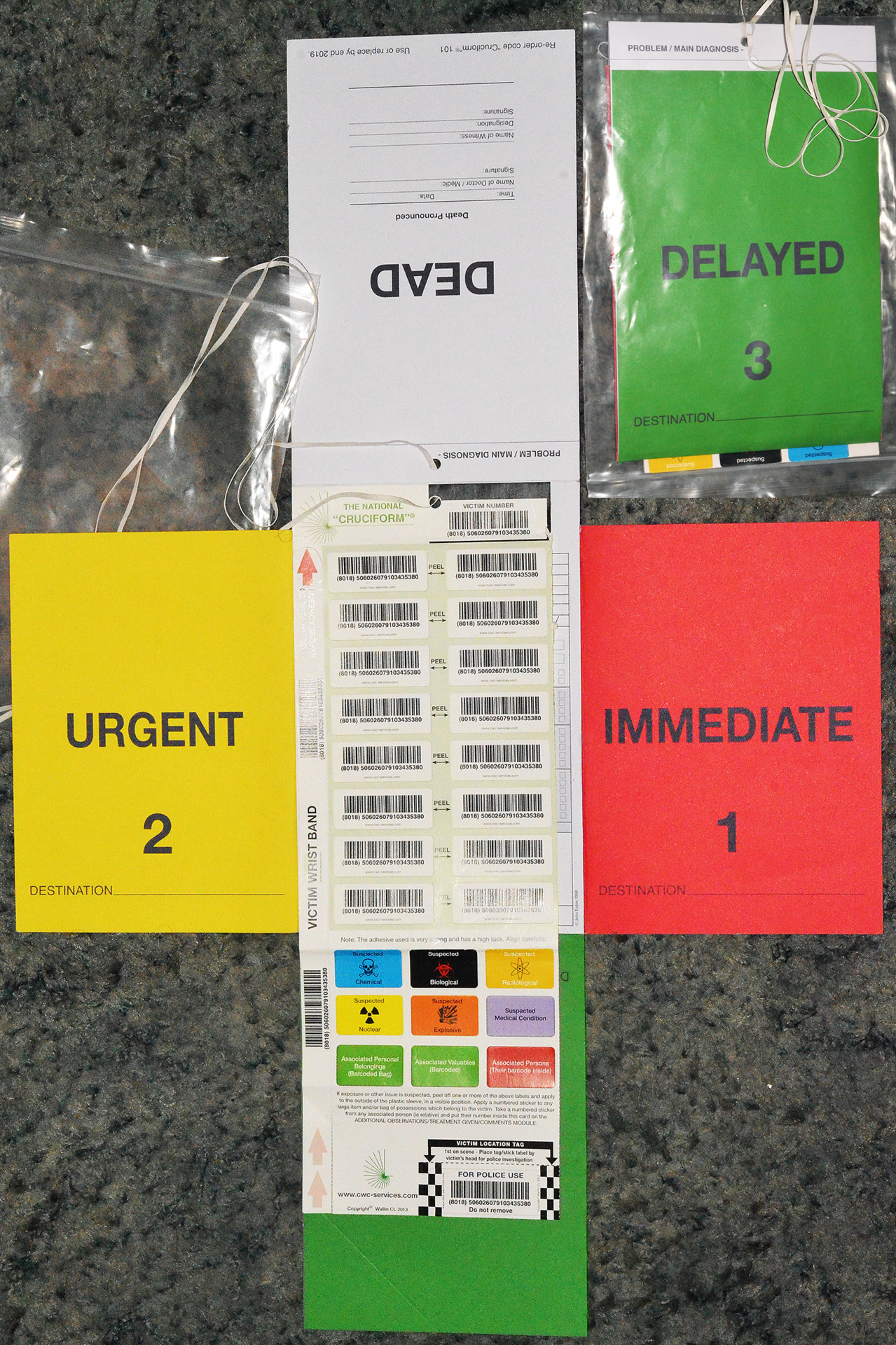
Cruciform Triage card (© 2015 CWC Services), fully unfolded front

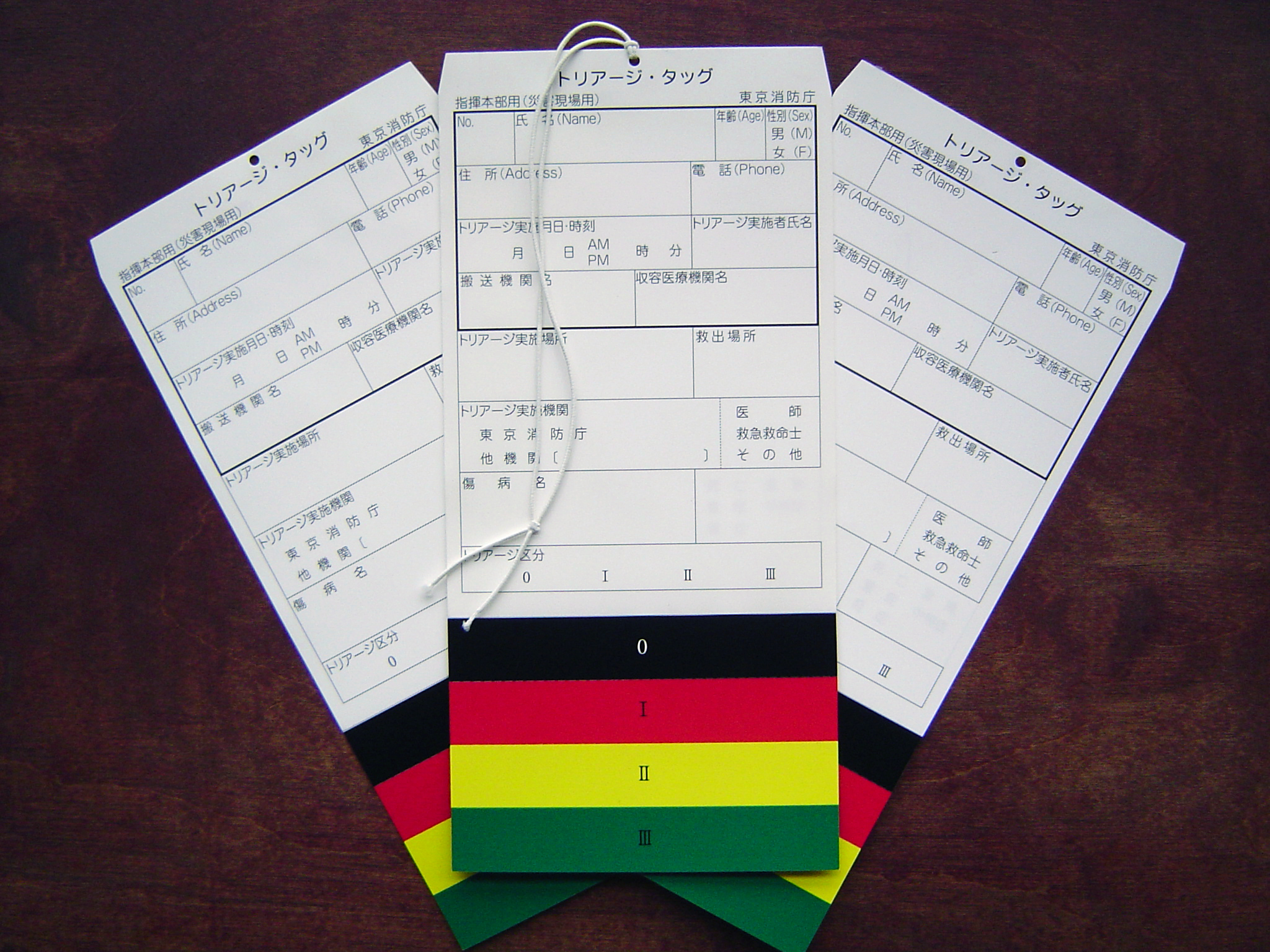
METTAG system in Japanese

- The US military as well as many countries in the world use the MT-137 design by METTAG, while Maryland and New Jersey use their customized version.
- Medical Emergency Triage Tags (METTAGs) were developed in the early 1970s by The American Civil Defense Association, and are widely used among the U.S. military, federal, state, and local agencies, among others. The original MT-137 is a universal triage tool presenting no language or literacy barriers and can be used in the field by anyone of any nationality with minimal training or hands on experience. The MT-501 also by METTAG is a triage tag patterned after the S.A.L.T. triage algorithm which is Sort, Assess, Life-saving Interventions, and Treatment/Transport. The S.A.L.T. system has been adapted by the National Highway Traffic Safety Administration (NHTSA). The CB-100 is a Chemical Biological emergency triage tag which is used for Chem/Bio/Hazmat usage, Decon/Evac usage, and A-E Triage System. METTAG is owned and operated by TACDA, which is an acronym for The American Civil Defense Association. It is a 501(c)3 corporation that teaches civil defense concepts. Membership is free. https://tacda.org/
- The Cruciform triage card, used in the UK including the North Sea oil industry, by the Royal London Hospital during the 7 July 2005 London bombings and by medical and paramedical organisations worldwide. The International Cruciform has been produced for the Canada/North America (with appropriate terminology adjustments), and translated versions of the card are available for European and Asian markets. The Cruciform Evacuation System is a variation of the system applying Triage to mass planned and unplanned evacuation scenarios (e.g. hospital evacuations).
- The Smart Tag from TSG Associates. Adopted by the state of New York in 2004, the British Military in 2002, used by London Ambulance Service in the 7 July 2005 London bombings and by the combined forces Afghanistan in 2006. The tag is also used in Philadelphia, Boston and Nevada, and is mandated for use across the States of Connecticut and Massachusetts.

== See also ==
- Emergency Medical Technician
- First responders
- ISO 22324 Guidelines for colour-coded alerts
