= Revised Trauma Score =

System to evaluate injuries subsequent to violent trauma

- Purpose: physiologic scoring system

The Revised Trauma Score (RTS) is a physiologic scoring system based on the initial vital signs of a patient. A lower score indicates a higher severity of injury.

== Use in triage ==
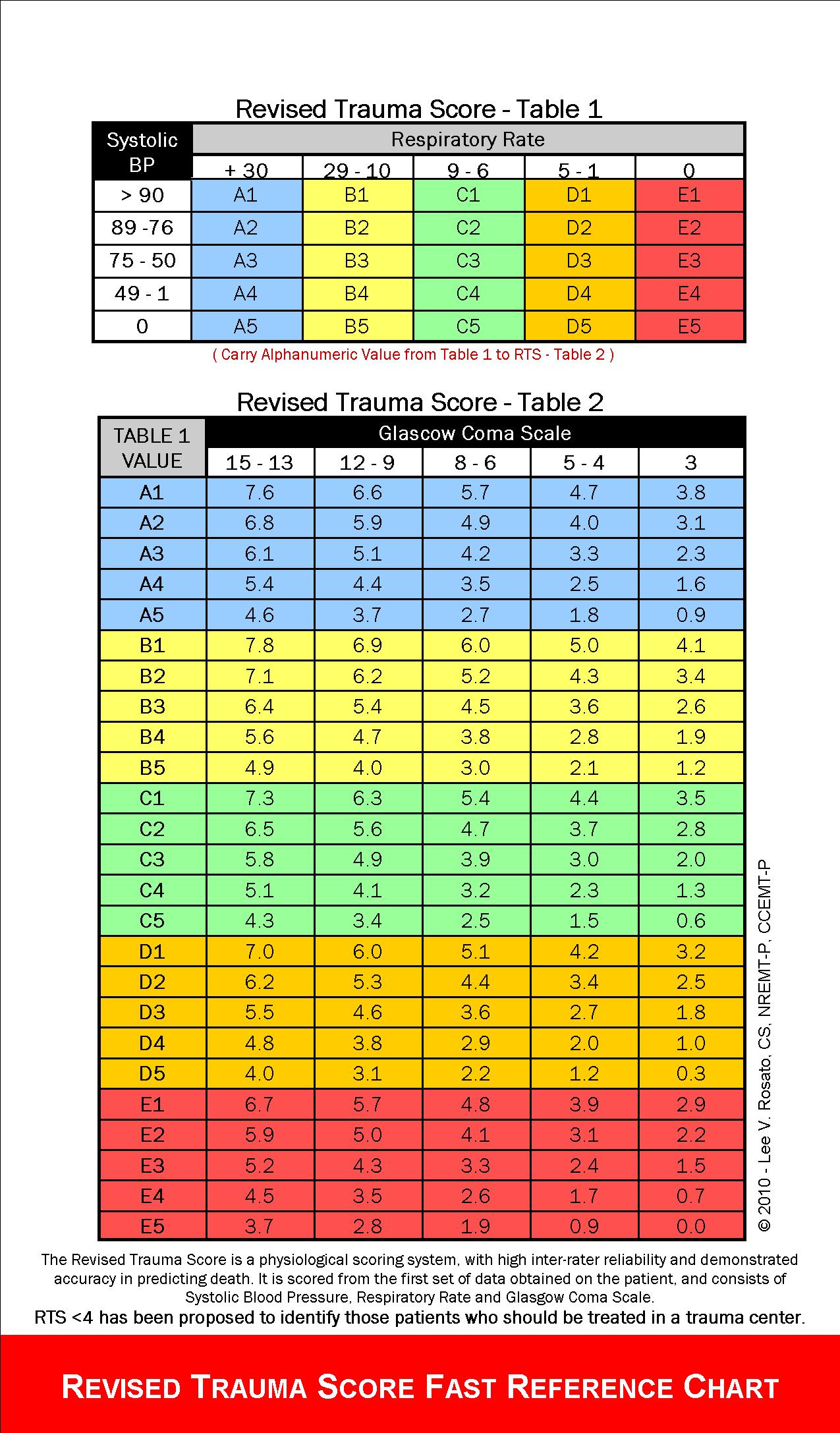

The Revised Trauma Score is made up of three categories: Glasgow Coma Scale, systolic blood pressure, and respiratory rate. The score range is 0–12. In START triage, a patient with an RTS score of 12 is labeled delayed, 11 is urgent, and 3–10 is immediate. Those who have an RTS below 3 are declared dead and should not receive certain care because they are highly unlikely to survive without a significant amount of resources.

== Scoring ==
The score is as follows:

Glasgow Coma Scale

GCS	Points
15–13	4
12–9	3
8–6	2
5–4	1
3	0

Systolic Blood Pressure

SBP	Points
>89	4
76–89	3
50–75	2
1–49	1
0	0

Respiratory Rate

RR	Points
10-29	4
>29	3
6–9	2
1–5	1
0	0

These three scores (Glasgow Coma Scale, Systolic Blood Pressure, Respiratory Rate) are then used to take the weighted sum by RTS = 0.9368 GCSP + 0.7326 SBPP + 0.2908 RRP Values for the RTS are in the range 0 to 7.8408. The RTS is heavily weighted towards the Glasgow Coma Scale to compensate for major head injury without multisystem injury or major physiological changes. A threshold of RTS < 4 has been proposed to identify those patients who should be treated in a trauma centre, although this value may be somewhat low.
