= Field triage =

Emergency medical process

Field triage is the process by which emergency medical services providers decide on the destination for the injured subject.

Each year, the approximately 1 million emergency medical services (EMS) providers have a substantial impact on the care of injured persons and on public health in the United States. The profound importance of daily on-scene triage decisions made by EMS providers is reinforced by CDC-supported research that shows that the overall risk of death was 25 percent lower when care was provided at a Level I trauma center than when it was provided at a non-trauma center. Not all injured patients can or should be transported to a Level I trauma center. Other hospitals can effectively meet the needs of patients with less severe injuries and may be closer to the scene. Transporting all injured patients to Level I centers—regardless of injury severity—limits the availability of Level I trauma center for those patients who really need the level of care provided at those facilities. Proper field triage ensures that patients are transported to the most appropriate healthcare facility that best matches their level of need.

== Background ==
In 1976, American College of Surgeons (ACS) ACS-COT began publishing resource documents to provide guidance for designation of facilities as trauma centers and appropriate care of acutely injured patients.

Before this guidance appeared, trauma victims were transported to the nearest hospital, regardless of the capability of that hospital, and often with little prehospital intervention.

ACS-COT regularly revised the resource document, which included the Decision Scheme. During each revision, the Decision Scheme was evaluated by a subcommittee of ACS-COT, which analyzed the available literature, considered expert opinion, and developed recommendations regarding additions and deletions to the Decision Scheme. Final approval of the recommendations rested with the ACS-COT Executive Committee. Since its initial publication in 1986, the Decision Scheme has been revised four times: in 1990, 1993, 1999 and 2006.

In recent years, CDC has taken an increasingly active role in the intersection between public health and acute injury care, including the publication in 2005 of an injury care research agenda. In 2005, with financial support from the National Highway Traffic Safety Administration (NHTSA), CDC convened a series of meetings of the National Expert Panel on Field Triage (the Panel) to guide the 2006 revision of the Decision Scheme. The Panel brought representatives with additional expertise to the revision process (e.g., persons in EMS, emergency medicine, public health, the automotive industry, and other federal agencies). The Panel had multiple objectives, including providing a vigorous review of the available evidence supporting the Decision Scheme, assisting with the dissemination of the revised scheme and the underlying rationale to the larger public health and acute injury care community, emphasizing the need for additional research in field triage, and establishing an evidence and decision base for future revisions. A major outcome of the Panel's meetings was the creation of the 2006 Field Triage Decision Scheme: The National Trauma Triage Protocol.

== Development of Field Triage Criteria ==
The development of field triage criteria paralleled the development of trauma centers, including the concept of bypassing closer facilities in favor of those with enhanced capabilities for treating severely injured patients. The initial 1976 guidance by ACS-COT contained no specific triage criteria but did include physiologic and anatomic measures that allowed stratification of patients by injury severity. Also in 1976, ACS-COT developed guidelines for the verification of trauma centers, including standards for personnel, facility, and processes deemed necessary for the optimal care of injured persons. Studies conducted in the 1970s and early to mid-1980s demonstrated a reduction in mortality in regions of the United States with specialized trauma centers. These studies led to a national consensus conference that resulted in publication of the first ACS field triage protocols, known as the Triage Decision Scheme, in 1986. Since 1986, this Decision Scheme has served as the basis for the field triage of trauma patients in the majority of EMS systems in the United States.

The Decision Scheme continues to serve as the template for field triage protocols in the majority of EMS systems across the United States, with some local and regional adaptation. Individual EMS systems may adapt the Decision Scheme to reflect the operational context in which they function. For example, the Decision Scheme may be modified to a specific environment (densely urban or extremely rural), to resources available (presence or absence of a specialized pediatric trauma center), or at the discretion of the local EMS medical director.

== Field Triage Decision Scheme ==
=== Field Triage Decision Scheme: The National Trauma Triage Protocol ===
The “Field Triage Decision Scheme: The National Trauma Triage Protocol” (Decision Scheme) educational initiative was developed to help EMS providers, EMS medical directors, trauma system leadership, and EMS management learn about and implement the revised Decision Scheme. This Decision Scheme was developed in 2006 in partnership with the American College of Surgeons-Committee on Trauma and the National Highway Traffic Safety Administration (NHTSA) and is grounded in current best practices in trauma triage. It has been endorsed by 17 organizations, along with concurrence from NHTSA, and is intended to be the foundation for the development, implementation, and evaluation of local and regional field triage protocols.

As part of this initiative, CDC has developed easy-to-use materials for EMS professionals. Each of these materials provides information that EMS professionals can use to take an active role in improving the health outcomes for persons injured in their communities.
