= Pentagon MASCAL =

2000 U.S. military exercise

The Pentagon Mass Casualty project (codenamed Pentagon Mascal) was a contingency exercise that was held in the Office of the Secretary of Defense conference room between October 24 and October 26, 2000. The exercise required emergency response teams, members of the defense protective services, and U.S. government officials to conduct emergency simulations in preparation for a possible plane crash into the Pentagon.

In the experiment, emergency personnel were required to hold radio and other communications devices to increase their operational readiness for quickly transporting massive casualties from the disaster area to medical centers. Toy trucks were used as miniature models to simulate emergency transport vehicles for victims.

The event is historically notable as a plane crash into the Pentagon did occur during the 2001 September 11 attacks 322 days later.
