= Triage =

Emergency medical process

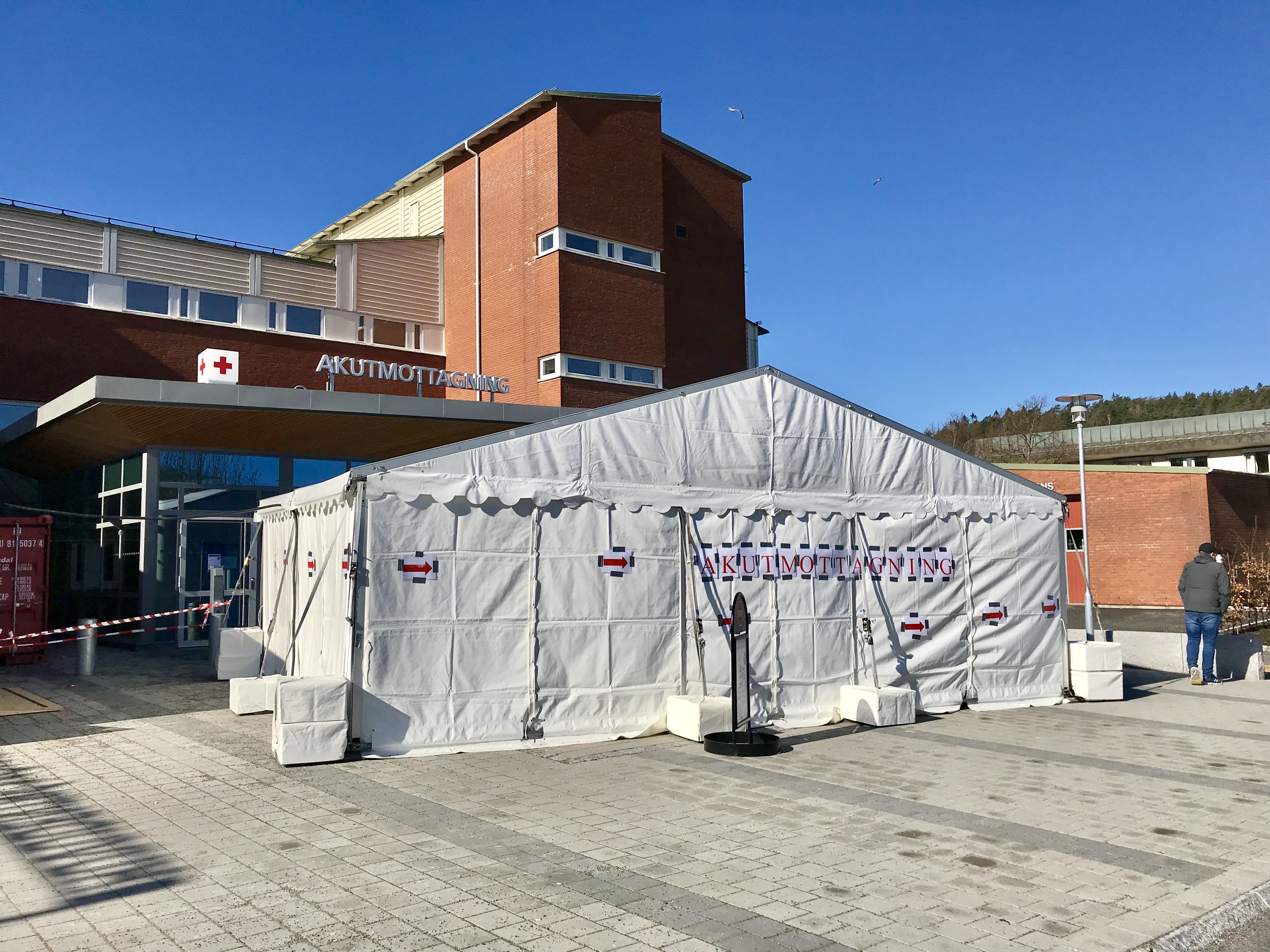
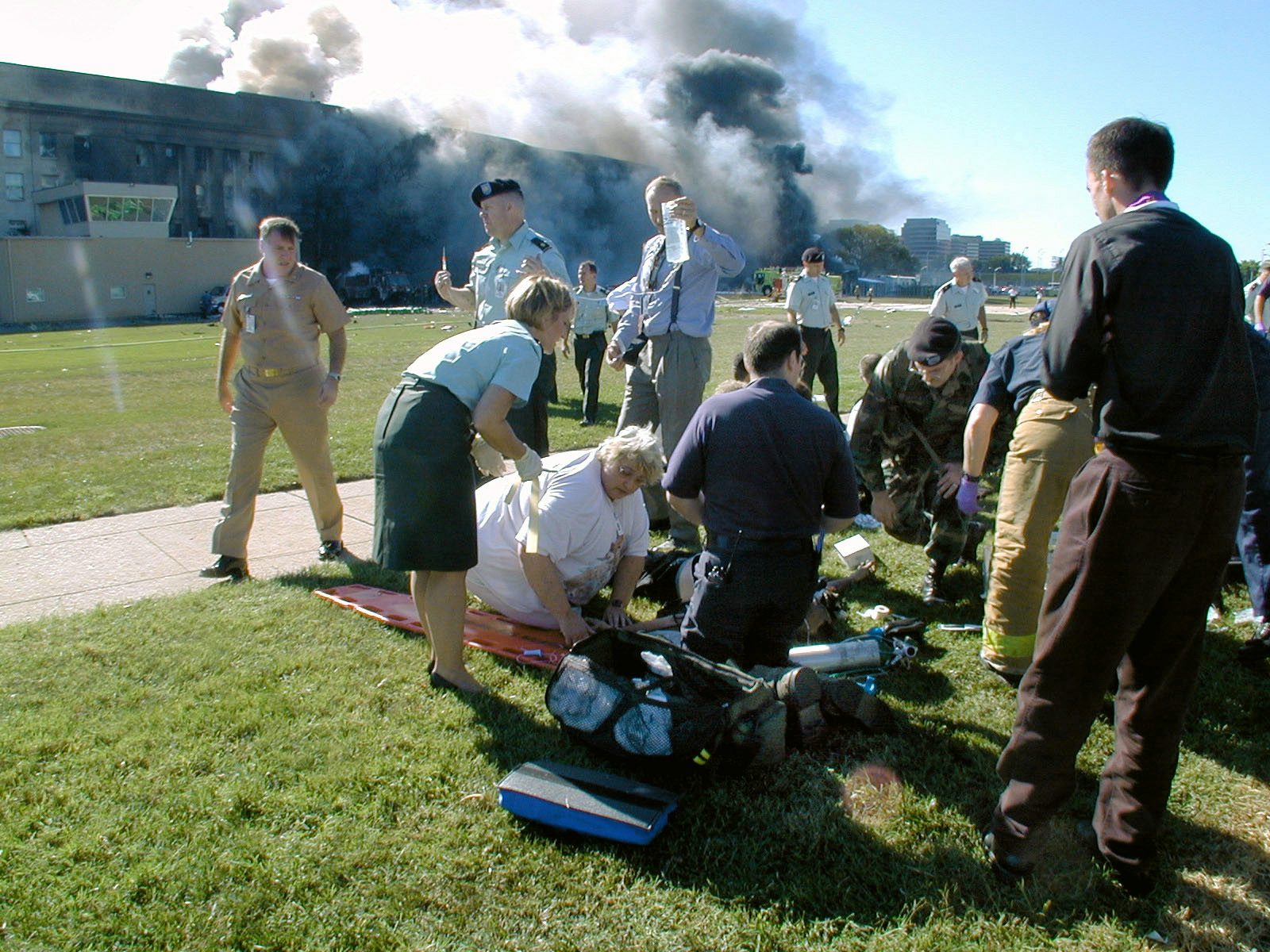
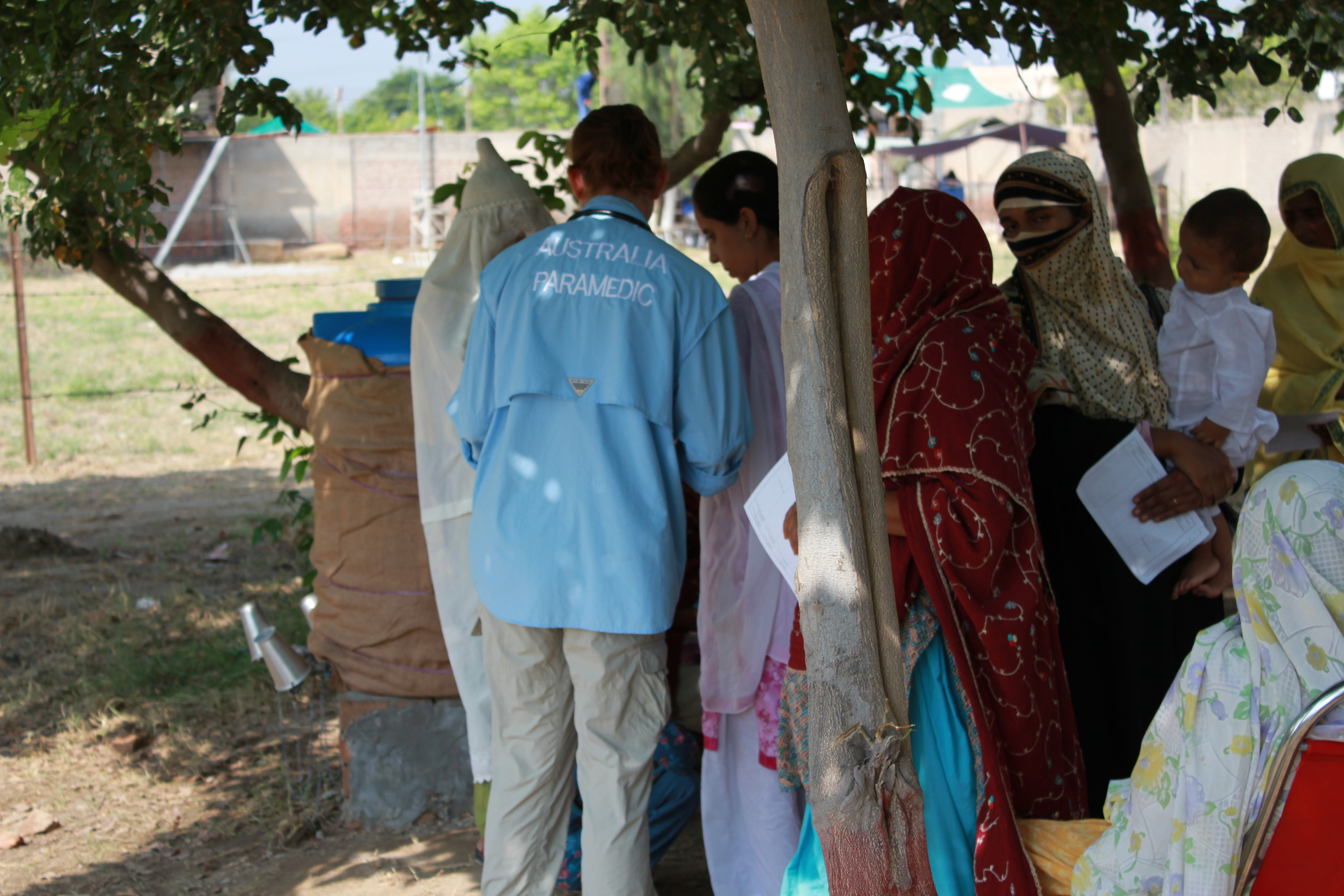
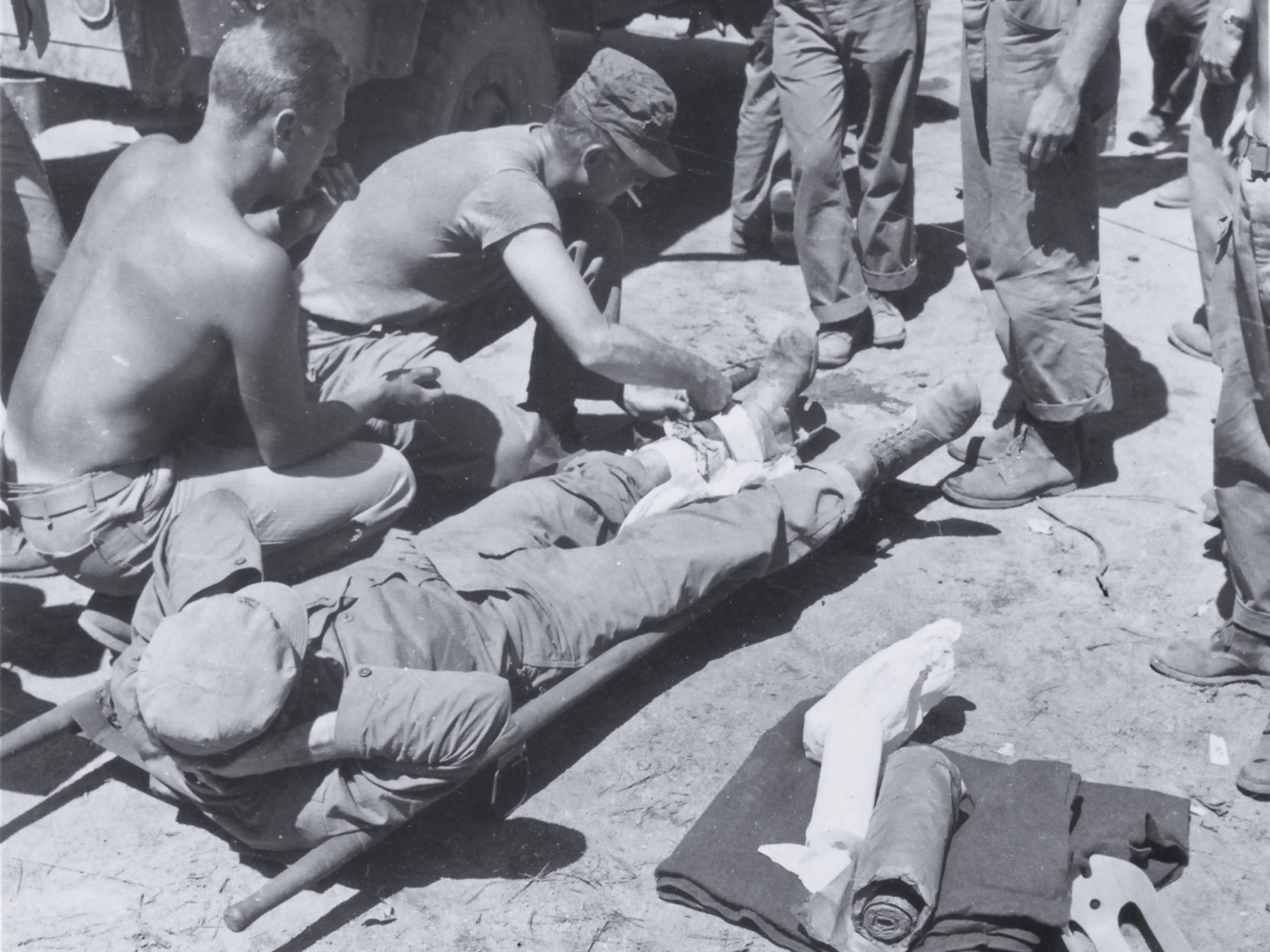
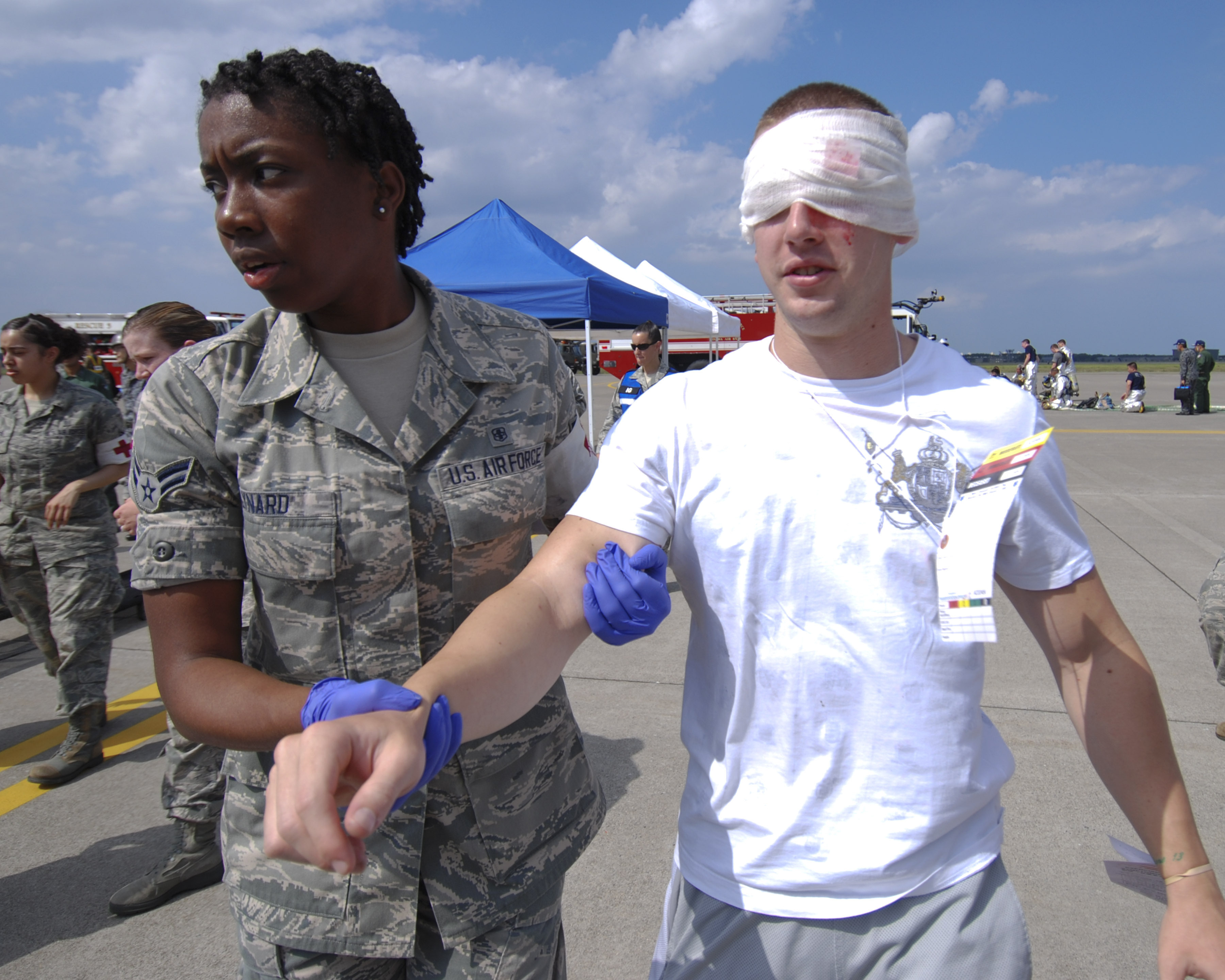
From top-left to bottom-right:
COVID-19 triage tent outside of a Swedish Hospital
9/11 triage station outside of the Pentagon
2010 Pakistan floods triage station under a tree
Korean War triage station in modern South Korea
Mass casualty drill at Misawa Air Base
CBRN triage drill at Yokota Air Base

In medicine, triage (/ˈtriː.ɑːʒ/, /tri.ˈɑːʒ/; French: [tʁiaʒ]) is a process by which care providers, such as medical professionals and those with first aid knowledge, determine the order of priority for providing treatment to injured individuals and/or inform the rationing of limited supplies so that they go to those who can most benefit from it. Triage is usually relied upon when there are more injured individuals than available care providers (known as a mass casualty incident) or when there are more injured individuals than supplies to treat them.

The methodologies of triage vary by institution, locality, and country, but have the same universal underlying concepts. In most cases, the triage process places the most injured and most able to be helped as the first priority, with the most terminally injured the last priority (except in the case of reverse triage). Triage systems vary dramatically based on a variety of factors, and can follow specific, measurable metrics, like trauma scoring systems, or can be based on the medical opinion of the provider. Triage is an imperfect practice, and can be largely subjective, especially when based on general opinion rather than a score. This is because triage needs to balance multiple and sometimes contradictory objectives simultaneously, most of them being fundamental to personhood: likelihood of death, efficacy of treatment, patients' remaining lifespan, ethics, and religion.

== Etymology and origin ==
The term triage comes directly from French triage, meaning the action of picking or sorting, it itself coming from the Old French verb trier, meaning to separate, sort, shift, or select; trier in turn came from late Latin tritare, to grind. Although the concept existed much earlier, at least as far back as the reign of Maximillian I, it was not until the 1800s that the Old French trier was used to describe the practice of triage. That year, Baron Dominique-Jean Larrey, the Surgeon in Chief of Napoleon's Imperial Guard, laid the groundwork for what would eventually become modern triage, introducing the concept of "treat[ing] the wounded according to the observed gravity of their injuries and the urgency for medical care, regardless of their rank or nationality".

== Concepts in triage ==
=== Simple triage ===
Simple triage is usually used in a scene of an accident or "mass-casualty incident" (MCI), in order to sort patients into those who need critical attention and immediate transport to a secondary or tertiary care facility to survive, those who require low-intensity care to survive, those who are uninjured, and those who are deceased or will be so imminently. In the United States, this most commonly takes the form of the START or SALT triage models, in Canada, the CTAS model, and in Australia the ATS model. Assessment often begins with asking anyone who can walk to walk to a designated area, labeling them the lowest priority, and assessing other patients from there. Upon completion of the initial assessment by the care provider, which is based on the so-called ABCDE approach, patients are generally labelled with their available information, including "patient’s name, sex, injuries, interventions, care-provider IDs, casualty triage score, and an easily visible overall triage category".

==== ABCDE Assessment ====
An ABCDE assessment (other variations include ABC, ABCD, ABCDEF, and many others, including those localized to non-English) is rapid patient assessment designed to check bodily function in order of importance.

ABCDE Assessment Example
Letter	Term	Meaning
A	Airway	Checking for airway obstruction
B	Breathing	Checking if the patient is breathing and if the breathing is normal
C	Circulation	Checking to see if the heart rate and capillary refill time is normal
D	Disability	Checking the patient's alertness, awareness, and response to painful stimuli
E	Exposure	Checking the patient for trauma, bleeding, temperature, and other skin signs

==== Tags ====
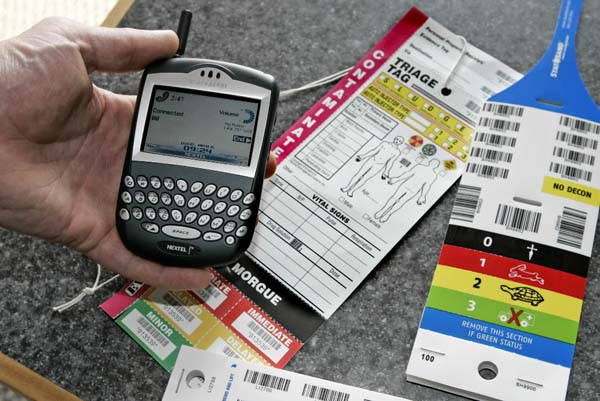
Many triage systems use triage tags with specific formats

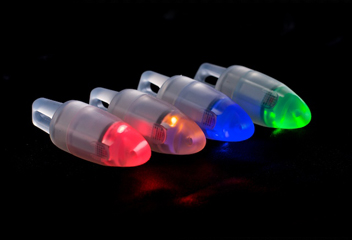
Emergency Triage (E/T) Lights – particularly useful at night or under adverse conditions

A triage tag is a premade label placed on each patient that serves to accomplish several objectives:

- identify the patient.
- bear record of assessment findings.
- identify the priority of the patient's need for medical treatment and transport from the emergency scene.
- track the patients' progress through the triage process.
- identify additional hazards such as contamination.

Triage tags take a variety of forms. Some countries use a nationally standardized triage tag, while in other countries commercially available triage tags are used, which vary by jurisdictional choice. In some cases, international organizations also have standardized tags, as is the case with NATO. The most commonly used commercial systems include the METTAG, the SMARTTAG, E/T LIGHT and the CRUCIFORM systems. More advanced tagging systems incorporate special markers to indicate whether or not patients have been contaminated by hazardous materials, and also tear off strips for tracking the movement of patients through the process.

=== Advanced triage ===
In advanced triage, those with advanced training, such as doctors, nurses and paramedics make further care determinations based on more in-depth assessments, and may make use of advanced diagnostics like CT scans. This can also be a form of secondary triage, where the evaluation occurs at a secondary location like a hospital, or after the arrival of more qualified care providers.

=== Reverse triage ===
There are three primary concepts referred to as reverse triage. The first is concerned with the discharge of patients from hospital often to prepare for an incoming mass casualty. The second concept of Reverse Triage is utilized for certain conditions such as lightning injuries, where those appearing to be dead may be treated ahead of other patients, as they can typically be resuscitated successfully. The third is the concept of treating the least injured, often to return them to functional capability. This approach originated in the military, where returning combatants to the theatre of war may lead to overall victory (and survivability).

=== Undertriage and overtriage ===
Undertriage is underestimating the severity of an illness or injury. An example of this would be categorizing a Priority 1 (Immediate) patient as a Priority 2 (Delayed) or Priority 3 (Minimal). The rate of undertriage generally varies by the location of the triage, with a 2014 review of triage practices in emergency rooms finding that in-hospital undertriaging occurred 34% of the time in the United States, while reviews of pre-hospital triage finding undertriage rates of 14%.

Overtriage is the overestimating of the severity of an illness or injury. An example of this would be categorizing a Priority 3 (Minimal) patient as a Priority 2 (Delayed) or Priority 1 (Immediate). Acceptable overtriage rates have been typically up to 50% in an effort to avoid undertriage. Some studies suggest that overtriage is less likely to occur when triaging is performed by hospital medical teams, rather than paramedics or EMTs.

=== Telephone triage ===
In telephone triage, care providers like nurses assess symptoms and medical history, and make a care recommendation over the phone. A review of available literature found that these services provide accurate and safe information about 90% of the time.

=== Palliative care ===
In triage, palliative care takes on a wider applicability, as some conditions which may be survivable outside of extreme circumstances become unsurvivable due to the nature of a mass casualty incident. For these patients, as well as those who are deemed to be unsavable, palliative care can mean the difference of a painful death, and a relatively peaceful one. During the COVID-19 pandemic issues of palliative care in triage became more obvious as some countries were forced to deny care to large groups of individuals due to lack of supplies and ventilators.

=== Evacuation ===
In the field, evacuation of all casualties is the ultimate goal, so that the site of the incident can ultimately be cleared, if necessary investigated, and eventually rendered safe. Additional considerations must be made to avoid overwhelming local resources, and in some extreme cases, this can mean evacuating some patients to other countries.

=== Alternative care facilities ===
Alternative care facilities are places that are set up for the care of large numbers of patients, or are places that could be so set up. Examples include schools, sports stadiums, and large camps that can be prepared and used for the care, feeding, and holding of large numbers of victims of a mass casualty or other type of event. Such improvised facilities are generally developed in cooperation with the local hospital, which sees them as a strategy for creating surge capacity. While hospitals remain the preferred destination for all patients, during a mass casualty event such improvised facilities may be required in order to divert low-acuity patients away from hospitals in order to prevent the hospitals becoming overwhelmed.

== Pre-modern history of triage ==
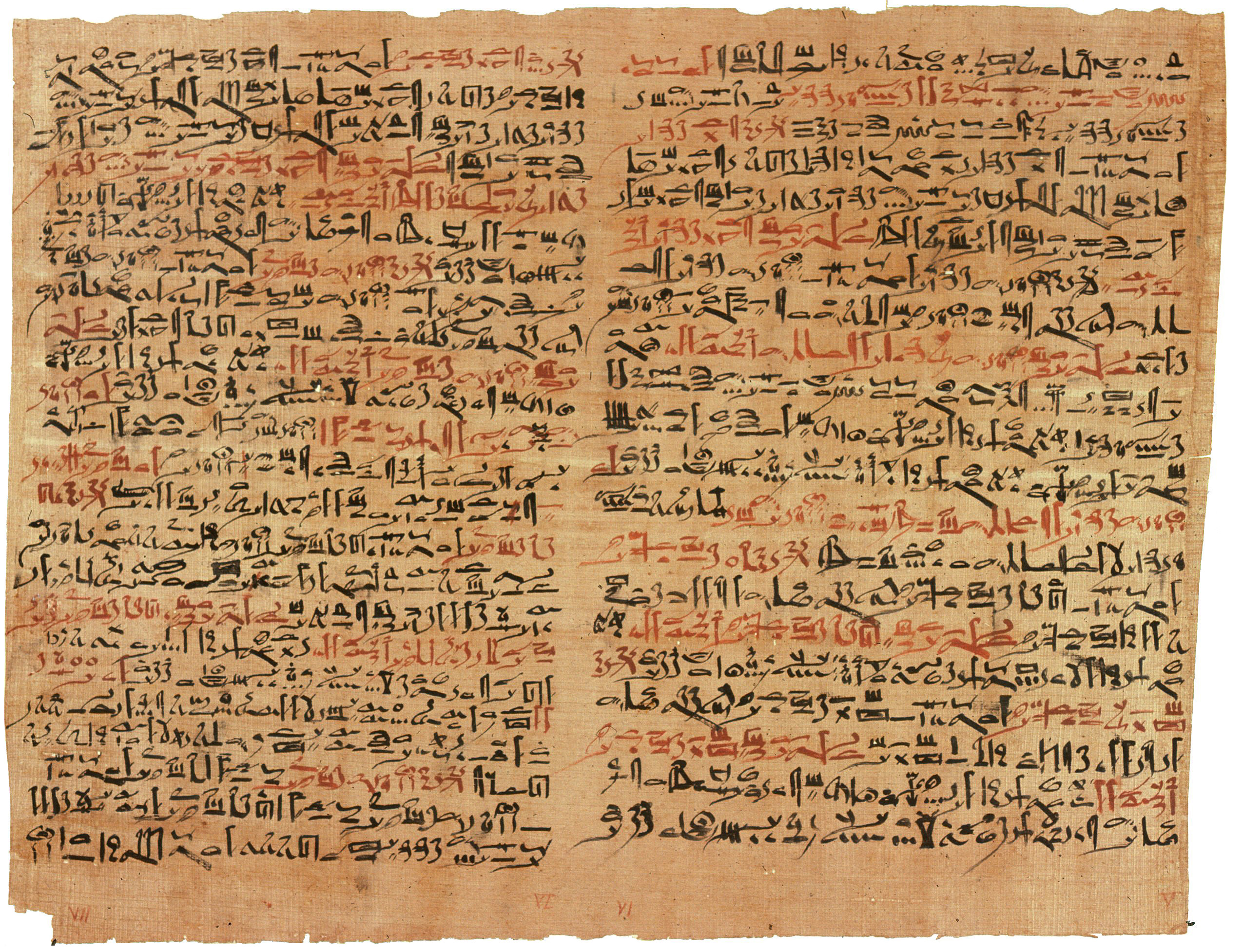
A page of the Edwin Smith Papyrus

=== The Edwin Smith Papyrus ===
The general concept was first described in a 17th-century BCE Egyptian document, the Edwin Smith Papyrus. Discovered in 1862, outside of modern-day Luxor, Egypt, the Edwin Smith Papyrus contains descriptions of the assessment and treatment of a multitude of medical conditions, and divides injuries into three categories:

1. "A medical condition I can heal"
2. "A medical condition I intend to fight with."
3. "A medical condition that cannot be healed."

=== The Holy Roman Empire ===
During the reign of Emperor Maximilian I, during wartime, a policy was implemented where soldiers were prioritized over all others in hospitals, and the sickest soldiers received treatment first.

== Modern history of triage ==
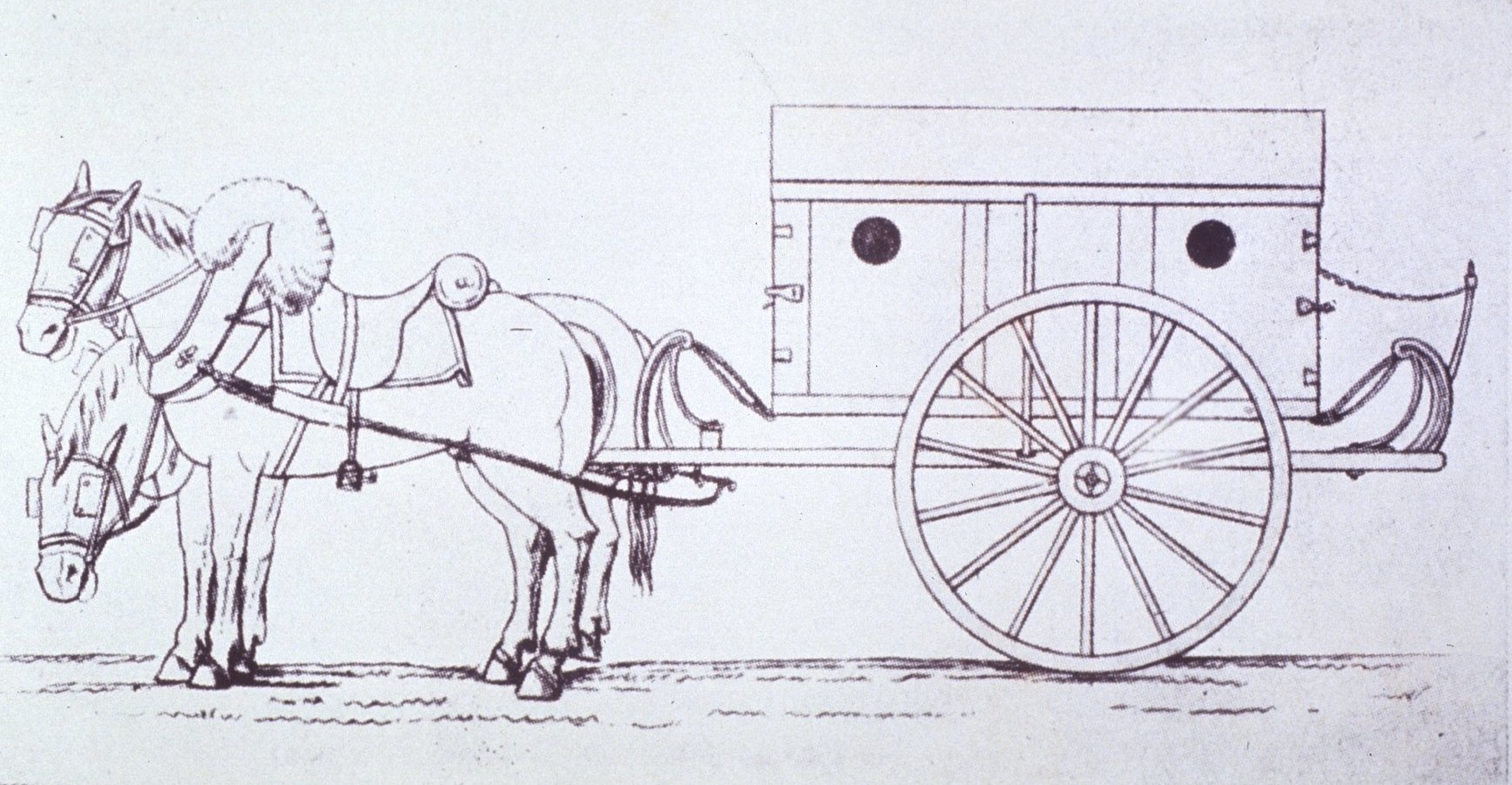
Larrey's "flying ambulance" design.

=== Napoleonic triage ===
Modern triage grew out of the work of Baron Dominique-Jean Larrey and Pierre-François Percy during the reign of Napoleon. Larrey in particular introduced the concept of a "flying ambulance" (flying in this case meaning rapidly moving) or in its native French, Ambulance Volante.

=== World War I ===
In 1914, Antoine Depage developed the five-tiered Ordre de Triage, a triage system which set specific benchmarks on evacuation, described staged evacuation. French and Belgian doctors began using these concepts to inform the treatment of casualties at aid stations behind the front. Those responsible for the removal of the wounded from a battlefield or their care afterwards would divide the victims into three categories:

- Those who are likely to live, regardless of what care they receive;
- Those who are unlikely to live, regardless of what care they receive;
- Those for whom immediate care may make a positive difference in outcome.

From that delineation, aid workers would follow the Ordre de Triage:

==== First Order of Triage ====
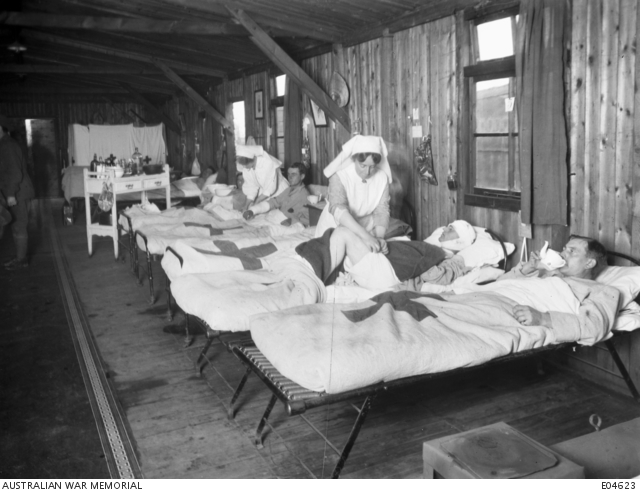
Casualty Clearing Station as described in the Second Order of Triage

In the first order of triage, the injured would be evacuated to clearing stations in the night, when darkness offered maximum protection from the German forces.

==== Second Order of Triage ====
Once at a casualty clearing station, wounds were dressed, and anyone requiring immediate surgical intervention was placed in a cart and brought immediately to an ambulance pickup area. If the wounded could wait, they would be evacuated by ambulance during the night.

==== Third Order of Triage ====
Ambulances, driven by YMCA and American Red Cross trained drivers then removed the casualties to mobile surgical centers, called postes avances des hospitaux du front or outposts of the frontline hospitals.

==== Fourth Order of Triage ====
At the mobile surgical hospitals, the most severe cases were treated, specifically those who were likely to die before reaching a permanent, more equipped hospital. Anyone who could survive the trip was transported to a farther away, often costal, hospital.

==== Fifth Order of Triage ====
Upon reaching a permanent hospital, casualties received appropriate care to treat all of their injuries.

=== World War II ===
By the onset of World War II, American and British forces had adopted and adapted triage, with other global powers doing the same. The increased availability of airplanes allowed rapid evacuation to a hospital outside of the warzone to become a part of the triage process. Although the basic practices remained the same as in World War I, with initial evacuation to an aid station, followed by transitions to higher levels of care, and eventual admission to a permanent hospital, more advanced care was provided at each stage, and the mindset of treating only what was absolutely necessary fell away. Although triage almost certainly occurred in the days after the atomic bombings of Hiroshima and Nagasaki, the pandemonium caused by the attack left records of such action non-existent until after the fifth day, at which point they are largely without historical use.

=== The Texas City disaster (1947) ===
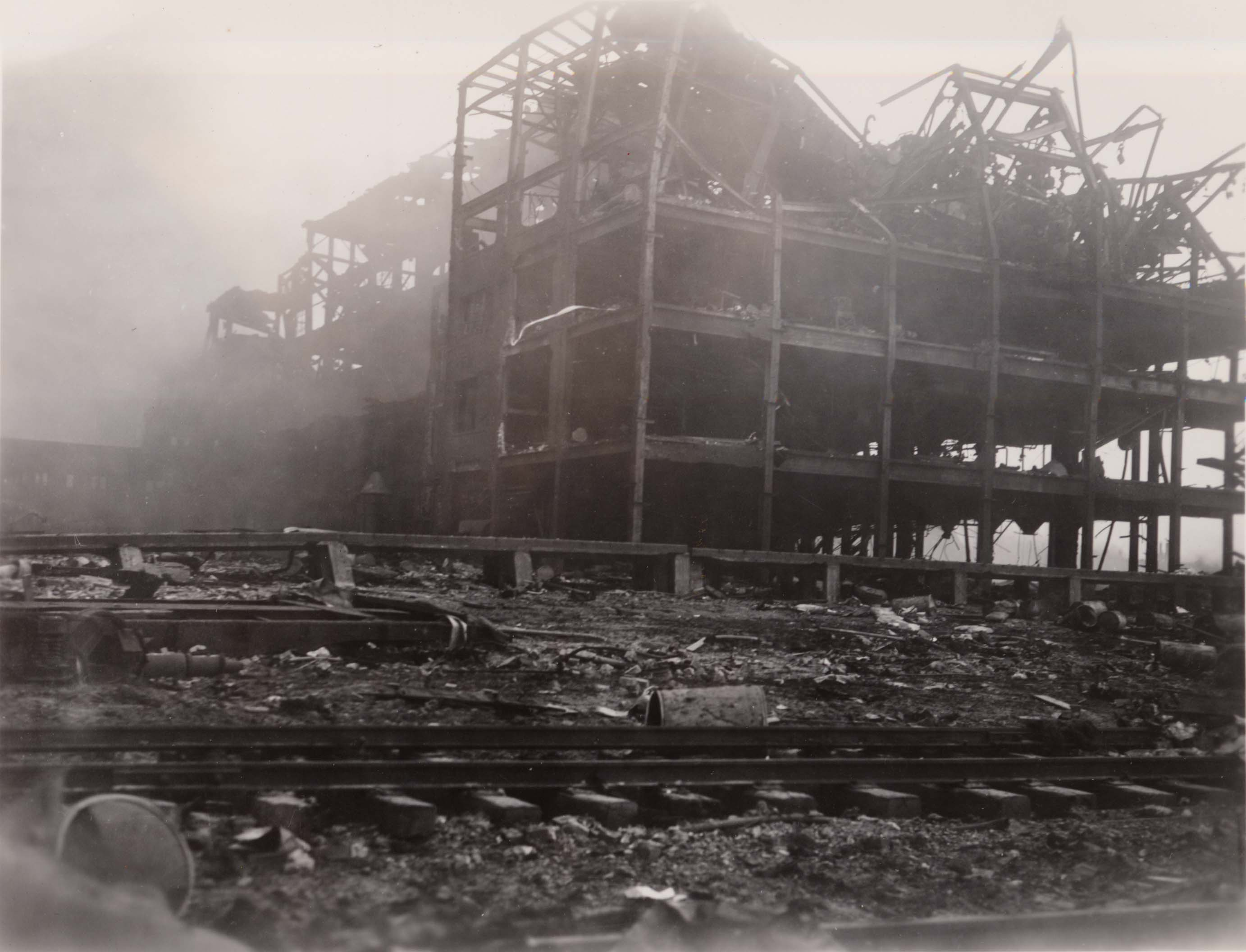
A destroyed rubber factory from the Texas City Disaster

In 1947, the Texas City Disaster occurred when the SS Grandcamp exploded in Texas City, Texas, killing 600 people and injuring thousands more. The entire fire department was killed in the blast, and what followed was a massive informal triage of the victims. Drug stores, clinics, and homes were opened as makeshift triage stations. As the city has no hospital, they had to evacuate casualties to area facilities, including those in Galveston and Houston, with at least one doctor relying on skills he had learned in World War II to inform care decisions.

=== The Korean War ===
The Korean War saw the advent of the tiered triage, wherein care providers sorted people into categories defined ahead of time. These categories, immediate, delayed, minimal and expectant are still the basis for most triage systems today. The time period was also marked by improvements in medical understanding, including shock, which allowed effective interventions to be administered earlier in the Triage process, which in turn significantly improved outcomes. At the same time, Mobile Army Surgical Hospitals (MASH) were introduced along with helicopters for evacuation. These helicopters, however were used for evacuation only, and care was not provided in the air during the evacuation. These advances reduced fatalities for injured soldiers by up to 30%, and changed the nature of battlefield medicine significantly.

=== The Vietnam War ===
The conditions of the Vietnam War drove further development on the concepts created during the Korean War. Advances in helicopters allowed the introduction of the first helicopter medics, who were able to provide fluid resuscitation, and other interventions mid-flight. This made it so that the average time from injury to definitive care was less than two hours. This evolution also flowed into the everyday life, with air ambulances emerging in the civilian world by the mid-1960's. The use of triage in emergency departments and ambulance services also quickly followed.

=== The World Trade Center bombing (1993) ===
In 1993, the north tower of the World Trade Center was bombed, in a plot with a similar intended outcome as the later September 11th attacks. While search, rescue and triage operations immediately following were ordinary, the attack itself represented one of the first terrorist attacks affecting the United States directly. The fact that the U.S. was no longer seen as untouchable, along with the later Oklahoma City bombing in 1995, and the September 11th attack lead to long-term changes in triage practices to be more focused on operational safety and the risk of secondary attacks designed to kill care providers.

=== Matsumato sarin attack (1994) ===
In June 1994, emergency crews began responding to calls related to symptoms of toxic gas exposure in a neighborhood. Without proper personal protective equipment, more than 253 residents were evacuated and 50 were hospitalized. 20 vehicles were called to the scene, and a mobile operating center was set up nearby, likely within the zone of contamination. Unaware of the presence of Sarin, triage was performed following the standard system of the time, which ultimately resulted in eight care givers experiencing mild sarin poisoning, and an unknown amount of additional staff experiencing general malaise.

At the time, no decontamination procedures or gas masks were available for incidents involving contaminants. In response, the Japan Self-Defense Forces created a decontamination team, which was then instrumental to the response of the Tokyo subway sarin attack which occurred only seven months later.

=== Triage in the present day ===
As medical technology has advanced, so have modern approaches to triage, which are increasingly based on scientific models. The categorizations of the victims are frequently the result of triage scores based on specific physiological assessment findings. Some models, such as the START model may be algorithm-based. As triage concepts become more sophisticated, and to improve patient safety and quality of care, several human-in-the-loop decision-support tools have been designed on top of triage systems to standardize and automate the triage process (e.g., eCTAS, NHS 111) in both hospitals and the field. Moreover, the recent development of new machine learning methods offers the possibility to learn optimal triage policies from data and in time could replace or improve upon expert-crafted models.

== Specific triage systems and methods ==
Vital signs defining the color-coded triage. RR: respiratory rate; SpO2: saturation of peripheral oxygen (pulse oximetry); HR: heart rate; GCS: Glasgow Coma Score; Tp: temperature. Abnormal vital signs are strong predictors for intensive care unit admission and in-hospital mortality in adults triaged in the emergency department.

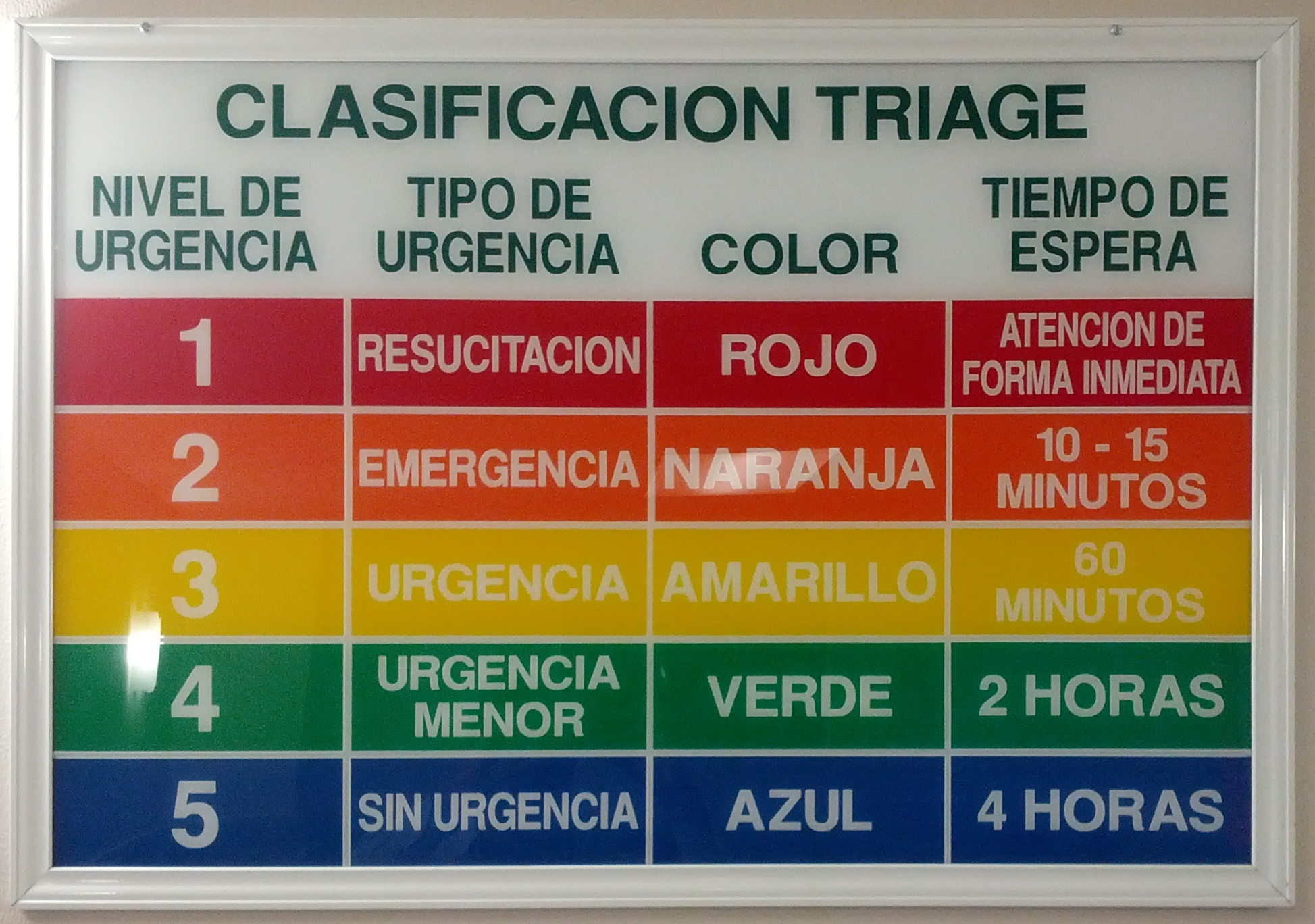
A triage sign at a Mexican emergency department indicating the waiting time for patients based on the severity of their condition

Most simply, the general purpose of triage is to sort patients by level of acuity to inform care decisions; so that the most people possible can be saved. Although a multitude of systems, color codes, codewords, and categories exist to help direct it, in all cases, triage follows the same basic process. In all systems, patients are first assessed for injuries, then, they are categorized based on the severity of those injuries. Although the number of categories differs from system to system, all have at least three in common; high severity, low severity, and deceased. Some systems involve features like scoring systems, such as the Revised Trauma Score, the Injury Severity Score, and the Trauma and Injury Severity Score, the latter of which has been shown to be most effective at determining outcome.

=== Triage systems by methodology ===
==== S.T.A.R.T. model ====
S.T.A.R.T. (Simple Triage and Rapid Treatment) is a simple triage system that can be performed by lightly trained lay and emergency personnel in emergencies. It was developed at Hoag Hospital in Newport Beach, California for use by emergency services in 1983.

Triage separates the injured into four groups:

- The expectant who are beyond help
- The injured who can be helped by immediate transportation
- The injured whose transport can be delayed
- Those with minor injuries who need help less urgently

Triage also sets priorities for evacuation and transport as follows:

- Deceased are left where they fell. These include those who are not breathing and repositioning their airway efforts were unsuccessful.
- Immediate or Priority 1 (red) evacuation to a medical facility as they need advanced medical care at once or within one hour. These people are in critical condition and would die without immediate assistance.
- Delayed or Priority 2 (yellow) can have their medical evacuation delayed until all immediate people have been transported. These people are in stable condition but require medical assistance.
- Minor or Priority 3 (green) are not evacuated until all immediate and delayed persons have been evacuated. These will not need advanced medical care for at least several hours. Continue to re-triage in case their condition worsens. These people are able to walk and may only need bandages and antiseptic.

==== JumpSTART triage ====
The JumpSTART pediatric triage MCI triage tool is a variation of the S.T.A.R.T. model. Both systems are used to sort patients into categories at mass casualty incidents (MCIs). However, JumpSTART was designed specifically for triaging children in disaster settings. Though JumpSTART was developed for use in children from infancy to age 8, where age is not immediately obvious, it is used in any patient who appears to be a child (patients who appear to be young adults are triaged using START).

==== Emergency Severity Index ====
The Emergency Severity Index (ESI) is a five-level emergency department triage algorithm, initially developed in 1998 by emergency physicians Richard Wurez and David Eitel, along with emergency nurses Nicki Gilboy, Taula Tanabe, and Debbie Travers. ESI triage is based on the acuity (severity) of patients' medical conditions in acute care settings and the number of resources their care is anticipated to require. This algorithm is practiced by paramedics and registered nurses primarily in hospitals.

==== Manchester Triage System ====
The Manchester Triage System (MTS) is a emergency department triage, initially developed in 1990s in Great Britain. The triage groups into 5 priority groups on first contact to doctors. MTS is based on discriminators or modifiers of confirmation or exclusion of several symptoms or clinical conditions. MTS uses 52 cards of reasons for a patient’s presentation in decision-making algorithm.

Manchester Triage System (MTS)
Levels		First Contact to Doctors
Priority 1	Red	Immediate
Priority 2	Orange	up to 10 minutes
Priority 3	Yellow	up to 60 minutes
Priority 4	Green	up to 120 minutes
Priority 5	Blue	up to 240 minutes

=== Triage systems by country ===
==== Australia and New Zealand ====
In hospital settings, Australia and New Zealand rely on the Australasian Triage Scale (abbreviated ATS and formally known as the National Triage Scale). The scale has been in use since 1994. The scale consists of 5 levels, with 1 being the most critical (resuscitation), and 5 being the least critical (nonurgent).

Australasian Triage Scale
Level	Description	Should be seen by provider within	Description
1	Resuscitation	0 minutes	Immediately life‑threatening
2	Emergency	10 minutes	Imminently life‑threatening, Important time‑critical treatment, Very severe pain
3	Urgent	30 minutes	Potentially life‑threatening, Situational urgency
4	Semi-Urgent	60 minutes	Potentially serious, Situational urgency, Significant complexity or severity
5	Nonurgent	120 minutes	Less urgent

In field settings, various standardized triage systems are used, and there is no area wide standard.

==== Canada ====
In 1995, the CAEP Triage and Acuity scale was launched in Canada relying on a simplified version of the Australian National Triage Scale. This scale used three categories, emergent, urgent, and non-urgent. This scale was deprecated in 1999 with the introduction of the Canadian Triage and Acuity Scale (CTAS), which is used across the country to sort incoming patients. The system categorizes patients by both injury and physiological findings, and ranks them by severity from 1–5 (1 being highest). The model is not currently used for mass casualty triage, and instead the START protocol and METTAG triage tags is used.

Canadian Triage and Acuity Scale (CTAS)
Level	Description	Should be seen by provider within
1	Resuscitation	0 minutes
2	Emergency	15 minutes
3	Urgent	30 minutes
4	Less Urgent	60 minutes
5	Non Urgent	120 minutes

==== France ====
In France, the Prehospital triage in case of a disaster uses a multi-tier scale:

- Décédé (deceased), or urgence dépassée (beyond urgency)
- Extrême urgence (extreme urgency): requiring care within a half hour.
- Urgence absolue (absolute urgency): requiring care within an hour.
- Urgence relative (relative urgency): requiring care, but not immediately.
- Blessé léger (slightly injured)
- Impliqué (involved, but not directly injured)

This triage is performed by a physician called médecin trieur (sorting medic).

==== Germany ====
The German triage system uses four color codes:

German Triage System
Category	Meaning	Action	Examples
Category TI	Acute, life-threatening condition	Immediate, highest priority treatment	Arterial lesions, internal haemorrhage, major amputations
Category T2	Severe injury requiring urgent treatment	Rapid transport and treatment	Minor amputations, flesh wounds, fractures and dislocations
Category T3	Minor injury or no injury	Physician examination, clearance and discharge as soon as possible	Minor lacerations, sprains, abrasions
Deceased	Already dead, or expectant	No/low priority. Identification, guarding and evacuation as possible	Death, injuries not compatible with life

The Manchester Triage System has also been introduced in Germany in 2004, in addition to its German-speaking neighbour countries. The MTS was introduced in Austria in 2009 and in German-speaking parts of Switzerland in 2011 (see also Manchester-Triage-System (in German).

==== Hong Kong ====
In Hong Kong, triage in accident and emergency departments is performed by experienced registered nurses, and patients are divided into five triage categories: Critical, Emergency, Urgent, Semi-urgent and Non-urgent. In mass casualty incidents, the START triage system is used.

==== Japan ====
In Japan, the triage system is mainly used by health professionals. The categories of triage, in corresponding color codes, are:

- Category I: Used for viable victims with potentially life-threatening conditions.
- Category II: Used for victims with non-life-threatening injuries, but who urgently require treatment.
- Category III: Used for victims with minor injuries that do not require ambulance transport.
- Category 0: Used for victims who are dead, or whose injuries make survival unlikely.

==== Portugal ====
In Portugal, the Manchester Triage System is used.

Portuguese Triage Protocol
Level	Description	Should be seen by provider within
1	Emergency	0 minutes; needs immediate treatment
2	Highly urgent	10 minutes; needs practically immediate treatment
3	Urgent	60 minutes; needs fast treatment, but can wait
4	Less Urgent	120 minutes; may wait or be forwarded to other medical services
5	Not Urgent	240 minutes; may wait or be forwarded to other medical services

==== Singapore ====
All public hospitals in Singapore use the Patient Acuity Category Scale (PACS) to triage patient in Emergency Departement. PACS is a symptom-based differential diagnosis approach that triages patients according to their presenting complaints and objective assessments such as vital signs and Glasgow Coma Scale, allowing acute patients to be identified quickly for treatment. PACS classifies patients into four main categories: P1, P2, P3, and P4.

Patient Acuity Category Scale
Category (Priority Level)	Category Name	Description	Example
P1	Critically ill and requires resuscitation	State of cardiovascular collapse or in imminent danger of collapse and require immediate medical attention.	Multiple major trauma, head injury with loss of consciousness, shortness of breath, unconsciousness from any cause
P2	Major emergency	unable to walk and are in some form of distress, appear stable on initial examination, and are not in imminent danger of collapse, requires very early attention	Chest pain, major limb fractures, major joint dislocations, spinal cord injury, trunk injury with stable vital signs
P3	Minor emergency	able to walk, have mild to moderate symptoms and require early treatment	All sprains, mild constant abdominal pain, fever with cough for several days, insect stings or animal bites (not in severe distress), superficial injuries with or without mild bleeding, minor head injury (alert, no vomiting), foreign object in ear, nose, or throat, urinary tract infections, headaches.
P4	Nonemergency	Old injury or condition that has been present for a long time.	Chronic lower back pain, high cholesterol, acne.

In mass casualty incidents, the START triage system is used.

==== Spain ====
In Spain, there are two models which are the most common found in hospitals around the country:

- The Sistema Estructurado de Triaje (SET), which is an adaptation of the Model Andorrà de Triatge (MAT). The system uses 650 reasons for medical appointment in 32 symptomatic categories, that together with some patient information and basic exploratory data, classifies the emergency within 5 levels of urgency.
- The "Manchester", based on the system with the same name in the UK, use 51 reasons for consultation. Through some yes/no questions, addressed in a diagram, it classifies the emergency in 5 severities.

In mass casualty incidents, the Modelo Extrahospitalario de Triaje Avanzado (META) (Advanced Triage Out of Hospital Model) system is used. META is a seven-stage system, classifying patients as: Red 1st, Red 2nd, Red 3rd, Yellow 1st, Yellow 2nd, Green, and Deceased. The system aligns with the ABCDE framework.

Advanced Triage Out-of-Hospital Model Modelo Extrahospitalario de Triaje Avanzado
Category	Meaning
Red 1st	Compromised airway
Red 2nd	Not breathing, or abnormally breathing
Red 3rd	Asystole, arrhythmia, or hemorrhage
Yellow 1st	Injury requiring urgent care
Yellow 2nd	Injury requiring delayed care
Green	Mildly or non-injured
Deceased	Dead

==== United Kingdom ====
In April 2023, the NHS and ambulance services adopted two new triage tools to be used in major incidents, replacing the NASMeD Triage Sieve. These new tools resulted from a multi-stakeholder review led by the NHS but its implementation became more urgent after the Manchester Arena Inquiry made it a monitored recommendation for the NHS and National Ambulance Resilience Unit to adopt.

===== Ten Second Triage Tool =====
The Ten Second Triage Tool (TST) was introduced as a way for all emergency services, including the police and fire service, to assess and prioritise mass casualties to provide lifesaving intervention. The tool allows for rapid assessment by removing the need to measure physiological vital signs focusing on what the emergency responder can see.

- P1 – Patients who have catastrophic bleeding, a penetrating injury or those who are unconscious
- P2 – Patients who are unable to walk but are conscious
- P3 – Patients who are able to walk
- Not Breathing – Patients who are not breathing (this replaces the deceased category)

===== NHS Major Incident Triage Tool =====
The Major Incident Triage Tool (MITT) serves as the more advanced triage tool for emergency medial responders to triage casualties. The tool, derived from the Modified Physiological Triage Tool, can be used on both adults and children, and also includes the assessment of physiological vital signs.

- P1 – Life-threatening injury
- P2 – Unconscious but breathing
- P3 – Non-life-threatening injury
- Dead – No signs of life or non-survivable injury

==== United States ====
A multitude of triage systems exist in the United States, and there is no national standard. Among local, regional, state, and interstate systems, the START triage method is most commonly used.

===== United States Armed Forces =====
The U.S. armed forces utilize a four-stage system, A battlefield situation, care providers rank casualties for precedence, treat those who they can safely, and transport casualties who need it to a higher level of care, either a Forward Surgical Team or Combat Support Hospital.

The triage categories (with corresponding color codes), in order of priority, are:

U.S. Armed Forces Triage Categories
Category	Description	Conditions
Immediate	Life-threatening injury	Airway or breathing issues, hemorrhage
Delayed	Potentially life-threatening injury	Shock, Fractures and dislocations, abdominal, spinal, thoracic, or head injuries, uncomplicated major burns
Minimal	Not life-threatening injuries	Cuts, bruises, abrasions, small bone fractures, minor burns, strains/sprains, frostbite
Expectant	Non-survivable injuries	Cardiac arrest, massive head or brain trauma, Second or third degree burns over 70% or more of body

== Limitations of current practices ==
Notions of mass casualty triage as an efficient rationing process of determining priority based upon injury severity are not supported by research, evaluation and testing of current triage practices, which lack scientific and methodological bases. START and START-like (START) triage that use color-coded categories to prioritize provide poor assessments of injury severity and then leave it to providers to subjectively order and allocate resources within flawed categories. Some of these limitations include:

- lacking the clear goal of maximizing the number of lives saved, as well as the focus, design and objective methodology to accomplish that goal (a protocol of taking the worst Immediate – lowest chances for survival – first can be statistically invalid and dangerous)
- using trauma measures that are problematic (e.g., capillary refill) and grouping into broad color-coded categories that are not in accordance with injury severities, medical evidence and needs. Categories do not differentiate among injury severities and survival probabilities, and are invalid based on categorical definitions and evacuation priorities
- ordering (prioritization) and allocating resources subjectively within Immediate and Delayed categories, which are neither reproducible nor scalable, with little chance of being optimal
- not considering/addressing size of incident, resources, and injury severities and prioritization within its categories – e.g., protocol does not change whether 3, 30 or 3,000 casualties require its use, and regardless of available resources to be rationed
- not considering differences in injury severities and survival probabilities between types of trauma (blunt versus penetrating, etc.) and ages
- resulting in inconsistent tagging and prioritizing/ordering of casualties and substantial overtriage

Research indicates there are wide ranges and overlaps of survival probabilities of the Immediate and Delayed categories, and other START limitations. The same physiologic measures can have markedly different survival probabilities for blunt and penetrating injuries. For example, a START Delayed (second priority) can have a survival probability of 63% for blunt trauma and a survival probability of 32% for penetrating trauma with the same physiological measures – both with expected rapid deterioration, while a START Immediate (first priority) can have survival probabilities that extend to above 95% with expected slow deterioration. Age categories exacerbate this. For example, a geriatric patient with a penetrating injury in the Delayed category can have an 8% survival probability, and a pediatric patient in the Immediate category can have a 98% survival probability. Issues with the other START categories have also been noted. In this context, color-coded tagging accuracy metrics are not scientifically meaningful.

Poor assessments, invalid categories, no objective methodology and tools for prioritizing casualties and allocating resources, and a protocol of worst first triage provide some challenges for emergency and disaster preparedness and response. These are clear obstacles for efficient triage and resource rationing, for maximizing savings of lives, for best practices and National Incident Management System (NIMS) compatibilities, and for effective response planning and training.

Inefficient triage also provides challenges in containing health care costs and waste. Field triage is based upon the notion of up to 50% overtriage as being acceptable. There have been no cost-benefit analyses of the costs and mitigation of triage inefficiencies embedded in the healthcare system. Such analyses are often required for healthcare grants funded by taxpayers, and represent normal engineering and management science practice. These inefficiencies relate to the following cost areas:

- tremendous investment in time and money since 9/11 to develop and improve responders' triage skills
- cited benefits from standardization of triage methodology, reproducibility and interoperability, and NIMS compatibilities
- avoided capital costs for taxpayer investment in additional EMS and trauma infrastructure
- wasteful daily resource utilization and increased operating costs from acceptance of substantial levels of overtriage
- prescribed values of a statistical life and estimated savings in human lives that could reasonably be expected using evidence-based triage practices
- ongoing performance improvements that could reasonably be expected from a more objective optimization-based triage system and practices

== Ethical considerations ==
Because treatment is intentionally delayed or withheld from individuals under this system, triage has ethical implications that complicate the decision-making process. Individuals involved in triage must take a comprehensive view of the process to ensure fidelity, veracity, justice, autonomy, and beneficence are safeguarded.

Ethical implications vary between different settings and the type of triage system employed, culminating in no single gold-standard approach to triage. Emergency departments are advised to preemptively plan strategies in attempts to mitigate the emotional burden on these triage responders. While doing so, standards of care must be maintained to preserve the safety of both patients and providers.

There is widespread agreement among ethicists that, in practice, during the COVID-19 pandemic triage should prioritize "those who have the best chance of surviving" and follow guidelines with strict criteria that consider both short-term and long-term survivability. Likewise, the triage of other health services has been adjusted during the pandemic to limit resource strain on hospitals.

=== Utilitarian approach and critique ===
Under the utilitarian model, triage works to maximize the survival outcomes of the most people possible. This approach implies that some individuals may likely suffer or die, in order for the majority to survive. Triage officers must allocate limited resources and weigh an individual's needs along with the needs of the population as a whole.

Some ethicists argue the utilitarian approach to triage is not an impartial mechanism, but rather a partial one that fails to address the social conditions that prevent optimal outcomes in marginalized communities, rendering it a practical but inadequate means of distributing health resources.

=== Special population groups ===
There is wide discussion regarding how VIPs and celebrities should be cared for in the emergency department. It is generally argued that giving special considerations or deviating from the standard medical protocol for VIPs or celebrities is unethical due to the cost to others. However, others argue that it may be morally justifiable as long as their treatment does not hinder the needs of others after assessing overall fairness, quality of care, privacy, and other ethical implications.

=== Proposed frameworks in conflict ===
A variety of logistical challenges complicate the triage and ultimate provision of care in conflict situations. Humanitarian actors acknowledge challenges like disruptions in food and medical supply chains, lack of suitable facilities, and existence of policies that prohibit administration of care to certain communities and populations as elements that directly impede the successful delivery of care. The logistical realities of humanitarian emergencies and conflict situations threatens the bioethical principle of beneficence, the obligation to act for the benefit of others.

=== Technical challenges of triage in conflict settings ===
To address the ethical concerns that underpin triage in conflict situations and humanitarian crises, new triage frameworks and classification systems have been suggested that aim to uphold human rights. Scholars have argued that new frameworks must prioritize informed consent and rely on established medical criteria only in order to respect the human rights considerations set forth by the Geneva Convention of 1864 and the Universal Declaration of Human Rights, but no comprehensive triage model has been adopted by international bodies.

=== Veterinary triage ===
Emergency veterinarian Jessica Fragola wrote in 2022 about the ethics of animal triage. She said that pressures on veterinarians have been exacerbated by staffing shortages that resulted from the COVID-19 pandemic, coupled with growth in spending on veterinary care and on pet insurance.

== See also ==
- Combat stress reaction
- Glasgow coma scale
- Hospital emergency codes
- Mass decontamination
- Remote patient monitoring
- Wilderness first aid
