= Simple triage and rapid treatment =

Method of triage used in a mass-casualty incident

- Purpose: classify victims during a mass casualty incident

Simple triage and rapid treatment (START) is a triage method used by first responders to quickly classify victims during a mass casualty incident (MCI) based on the severity of their injury. The method was developed in 1983 by the staff members of Hoag Hospital and Newport Beach Fire Department located in California, and is currently widely used in the United States.

== Classification ==
First responders using START evaluate victims and assign them to one of the following four categories:

- Deceased/expectant (black)
- Immediate (red)
- Delayed (yellow)
- Walking wounded/minor (green)

The colors correspond to triage tags, which are used by some agencies to indicate each victim's status, although physical tags are not necessary if patients can be physically sorted into different areas.

Responders arriving to the scene of a mass casualty incident may first ask that any victim who is able to walk relocate to a certain area, thereby identifying the ambulatory, or walking wounded, patients. Non-ambulatory patients are then assessed. The only medical intervention used prior to declaring a patient deceased is an attempt to open the airway. Any patient who is not breathing after this attempt is classified as deceased and given a black tag. No further interventions or therapies are attempted on deceased patients until all other patients have been treated. Patients who are breathing and have any of the following conditions are classified as immediate:

- Respiratory rate greater than 30 per minute;
- Radial pulse is absent, or capillary refill is over 2 seconds;
- Unable to follow simple commands

All other patients are classified as delayed.

== Treatment and evacuation ==
After all patients have been evaluated, responders use the START classifications to determine priorities for treatment or evacuation to a hospital. The most basic way to use the START classifications is to transport victims in a fixed priority manner: immediate victims, followed by delayed victims, followed by the walking wounded. More detailed secondary triage systems such as SAVE may also be used: in this case, the START classifications are used to determine the order in which victims should undergo secondary triage.

START is not a system for determining resource allocation. The classification algorithm used in START does not depend on the number of victims or on the number of resources available to treat them, nor does using START alone provide any prioritization of patients within any of the four triage classes. Therefore, significant differences in implementation of treatment and evacuation may exist across different agencies using START.

== Modifications to START and similar triage systems ==
Numerous agencies have developed modifications to START or new triage systems similar to START. One early proposed modification substituted the presence of a radial pulse for capillary refill in classifying patients as immediate. The Fire Department of New York uses a modified version of START with an orange or "urgent" classification intermediate in severity between immediate and delayed.

=== Modification for pediatric patients ===
START has also been modified to provide better treatment for children. One such modification is known as JumpSTART. There are several simple modifications to the adult version. The primary modification for use with pediatric patients is to change the "normal" respiratory rate: since children breathe faster than adults, JumpSTART assigns the immediate classification on the basis of respiratory rate only if the child's respiration is under 15 or over 45 per minute. Another change is in the apneic pediatric patient with a pulse the patient is given 5 breaths. If they resume breathing on their own, they are tagged as "immediate". If they do not resume breathing on their own, they are tagged as "deceased". Another needed bit of information is to decide who qualifies as a pediatric patient and who qualifies as an adult. This can quickly be decided by a rapid check for underarm hair development on boys, and breast bud or breast development on girls. If the age is known, the age cut off for child versus adult is 8 years old.

=== Similar triage systems ===
Other triage systems that are variations of or similar to START include Triage Sieve, Pediatric Triage Tape, and CareFlite Triage. Each of these systems uses four or five triage classes with the red, yellow, green, and black colors.

== Limitations ==
There is no accepted measure to judge the appropriateness of any given system in mass casualty triage. Like many other triage systems, START suffers from implementation problems such as substantial amounts of overtriage. One of the major strengths of START, its simplicity, is also a major limitation. Since START was developed, consensus has emerged that triage should be more sophisticated, by incorporating resource limitations and capacity in determining how to prioritize patients.

== See also ==
- First responders
- RPM-30-2-Can Do (mnemonic for START triage criteria)
