= Mass casualty incident =

Incident which results in medical care systems becoming overwhelmed

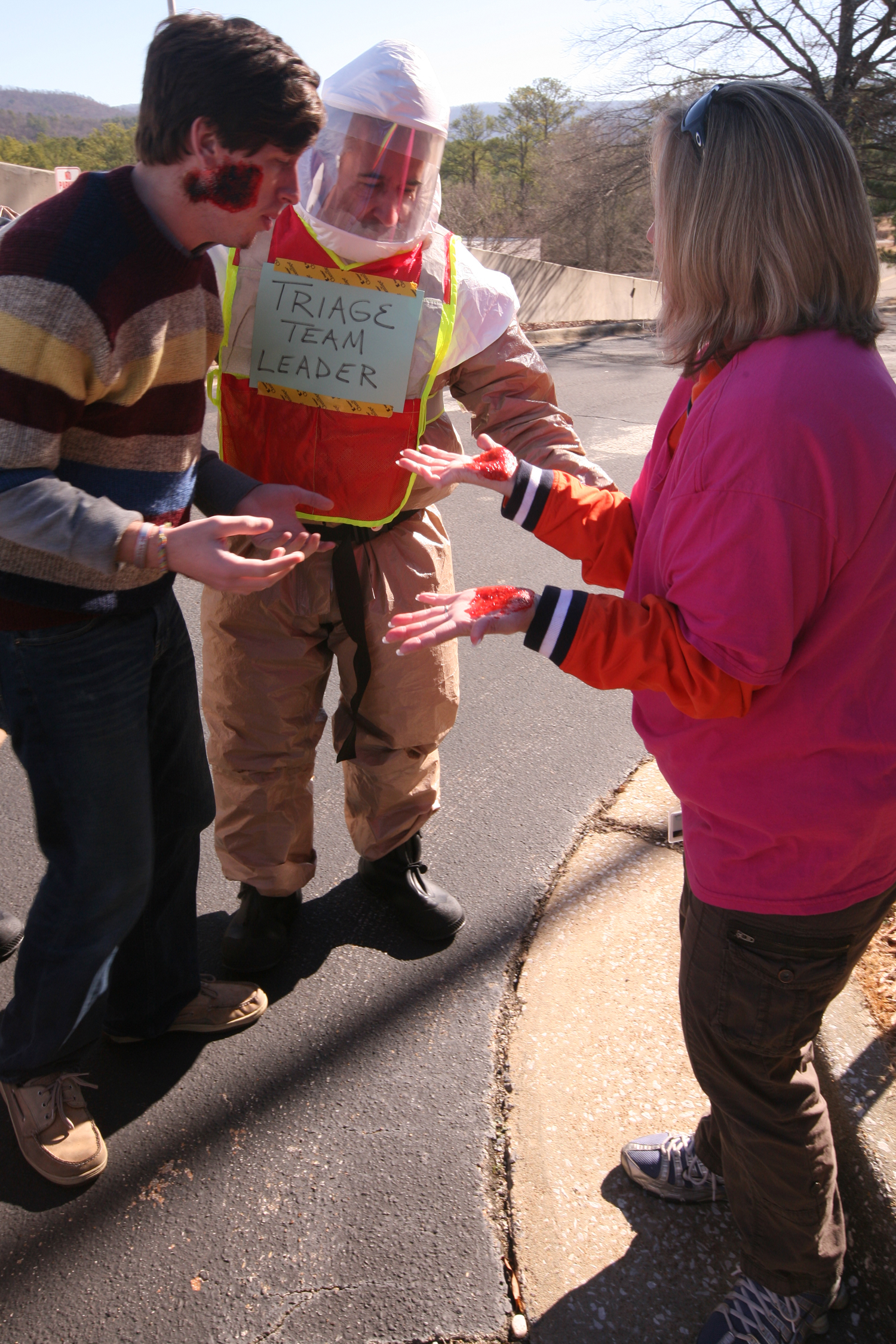
Anniston, Alabama, US, January 21, 2011: Healthcare workers triage simulated victims during an MCI drill at the Center for Domestic Preparedness.

A mass casualty incident (often shortened to MCI) describes an incident in which emergency medical services resources, such as personnel and equipment, are overwhelmed by the number and severity of casualties. This may include train and bus collisions, plane crashes, earthquakes and other emergencies with many injuries. Events such as the Oklahoma City bombing in 1995, the September 11 attacks in 2001, and the Boston Marathon bombing in 2013 are well known mass casualty incidents. The most common types of MCIs are generally caused by terrorism, mass-transportation accidents, fires or natural disasters. A multiple casualty incident an incident in which there are multiple casualties. The difference of a multiple casualty incident from a mass casualty incident is that in a multiple casualty incident there are enough resources and personelle to manage the incident. Resource availability is therefore critical to the management of MCIs. A multiple casualty incident can become a mass casualty incident if resources are overwhelmed.

== Declaration ==
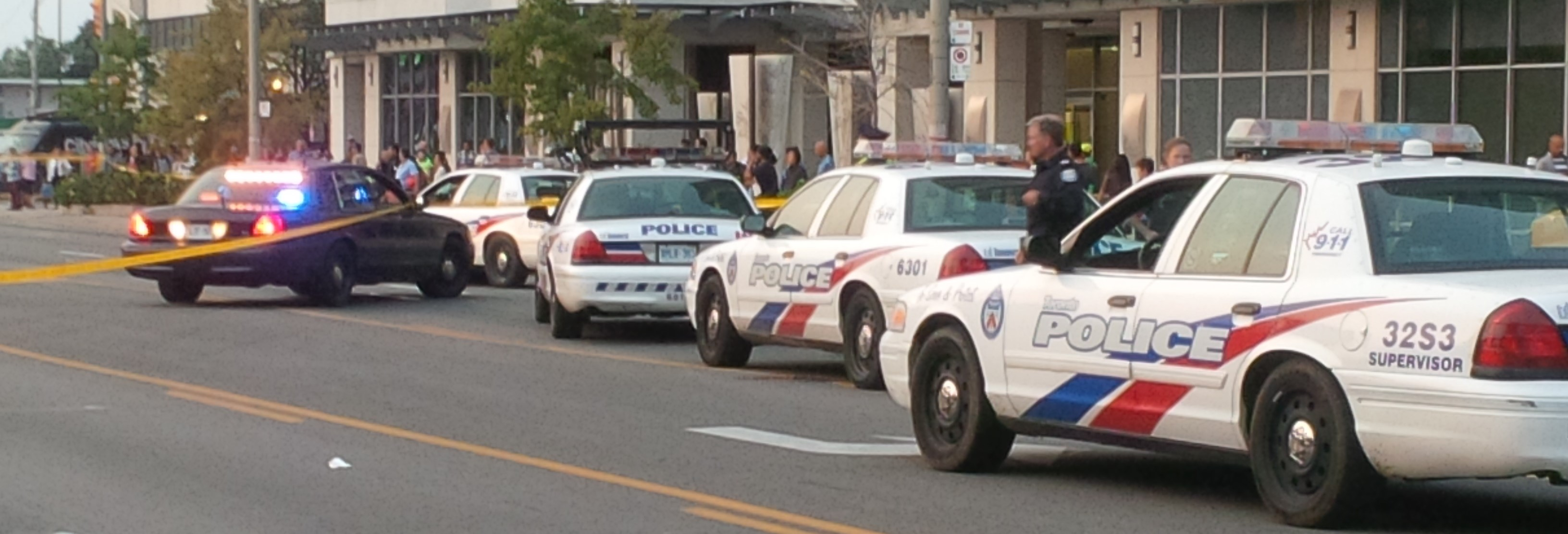
Police arrive at a mass casualty incident in Toronto

A mass casualty incident will usually be declared by the first arriving unit at the scene of the incident, and less usually by an emergency call dispatcher, depending on the information that is provided by emergency units. A formal declaration of an MCI is usually made by an officer or chief of the agency in charge. Initially, the senior paramedic at the scene will be in charge of the incident, but as additional resources arrive, a senior officer or chief will take command, usually using an incident command system structure to form a unified command to run all aspects of the incident. In the United States, the Incident Command System is known as the National Incident Management System (NIMS). According to the Federal Emergency Management Agency, "NIMS provides the template for the management of incidents."

=== Scene assessment ===
After the proper agencies have arrived, a more detailed assessment of the scene will be performed using the M.E.T.H.A.N.E method, which summarizes information necessary for responders:

- M Mass incident declared
- E Exact location
- T Type of incident
- H Hazards present
- A Access and egress
- N Number of casualties and severity
- E Emergency services required

== Agencies and responders ==
There are multiple agencies involved in most mass casualty incidents, which means there are many individuals that require training for these specific situations. The most common types of agencies and responders are listed below.

=== Emergency medical services (EMS) ===
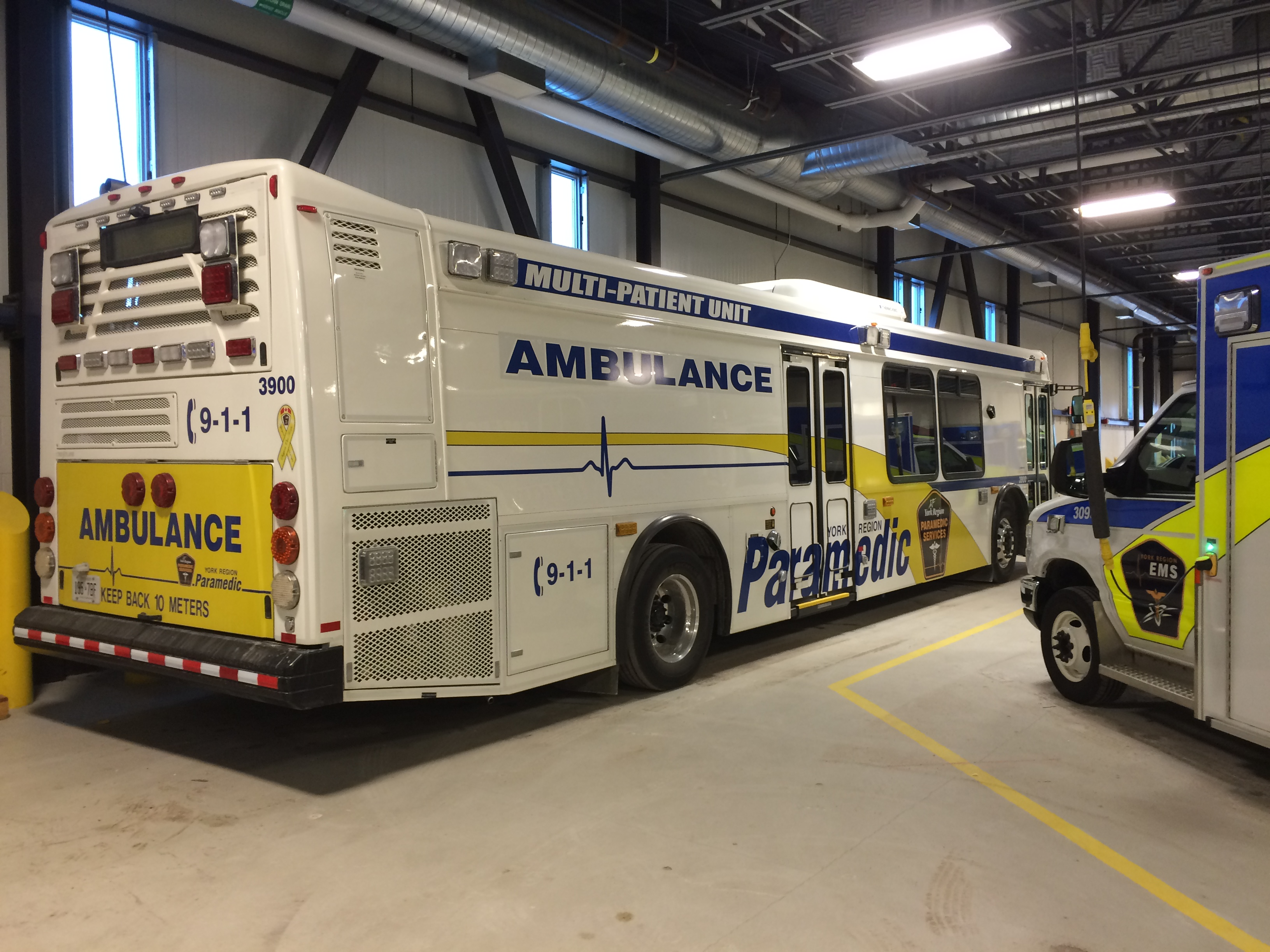
Ambulance buses often respond to mass casualty incidents to help transport the large amount of patients

- Certified first responders or emergency medical responders may arrive as part of local emergency medical services, or may arrive on their own. They will assist with all aspects of patient care, including triage and treatment at the scene, and transport from the scene to the hospital.
- Paramedic and emergency medical technician (EMT) personnel may arrive in ambulances, in their personal vehicles, or from another agency. They will have control of all aspects of patient care, as assigned by the medical officer or incident commander.
- Ground ambulances will be assigned to the transport sector to transport patients and personnel to and from the incident scene, emergency departments of hospitals, and a designated helipad. These ambulances may be municipal services, volunteer services, or from private corporations.
- Air ambulances will transport patients from the scene or from designated helipads to receiving hospitals.

=== Fire and rescue ===
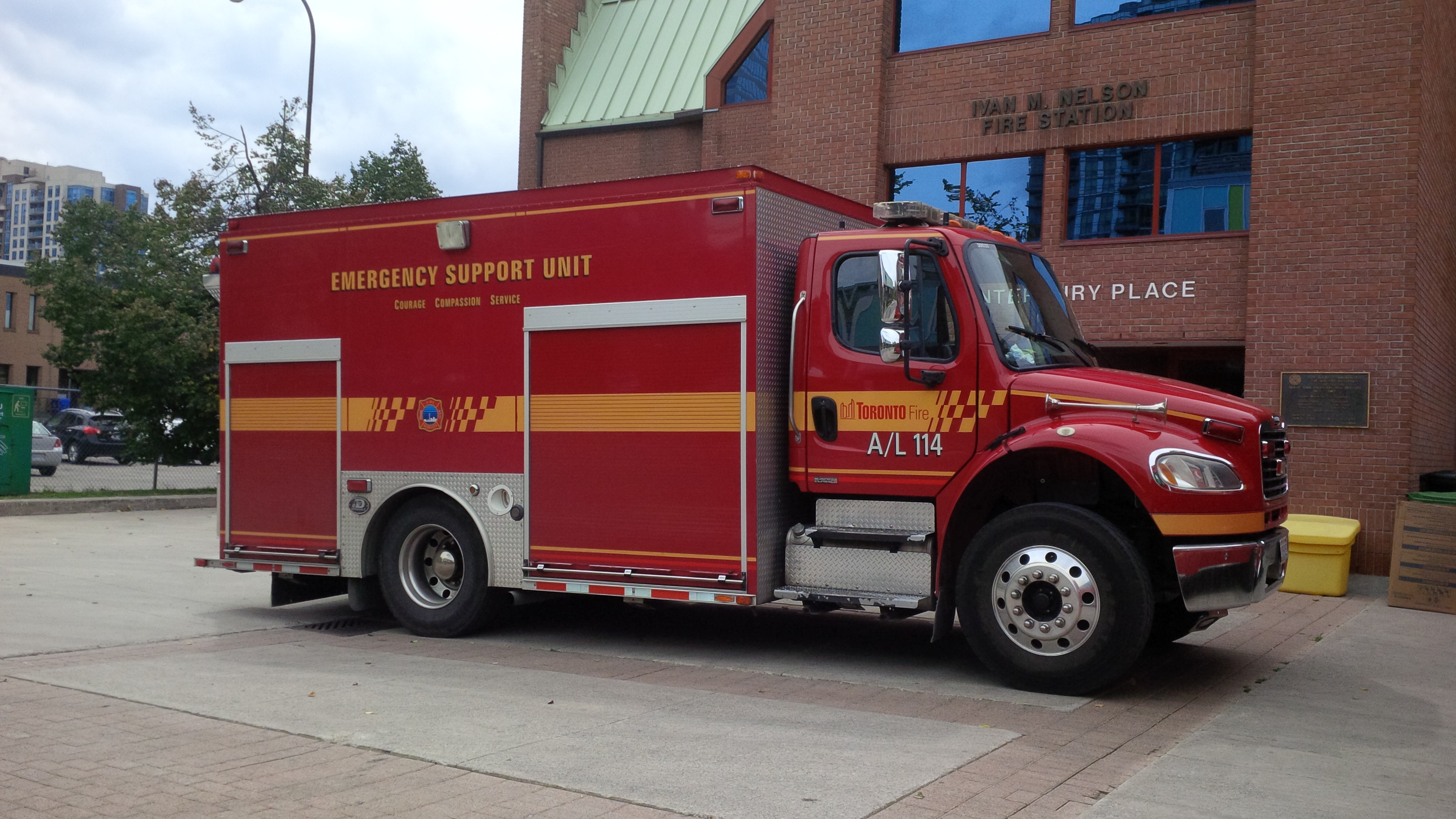
At night, firefighters will often utilize a Light and air unit to provide light to allow emergency responders to see properly

- Firefighters or rescue paramedics will perform all initial rescue-related operations, as well as fire suppression and prevention. They may also provide medical care if they are trained and assigned to do so. They may arrive on a fire truck or from another agency. Many areas near airports will have automatic mutual aid agreements with airport fire departments in the event of a plane crash outside of the airport boundaries.

=== Public Safety ===
- Police officers will secure and control access to the scene, to ensure safety and smooth operations.
- Utility services will ensure that utilities in the area are turned off as necessary, in order to prevent further injury or damage at the scene.
- Emergency Management Agencies may assist with procuring additional equipment and supplies for the incident. Emergency Management Incident Support Teams may assist with activities such as Planning, Logistics, Operations, and Recovery.
- Community Emergency Response Teams, or CERT, are civilians trained in basic emergency response and used to assist in disasters. These teams are usually trained and maintained by Emergency Management Agencies but may also be part of Fire Departments or EMS Agencies.
- Amateur Radio Emergency Services (ARES) or Radio Amateur Civil Emergency Services (RACES) are Amateur Radio operators trained to provide emergency communications during a disaster. Often in a disaster communication systems are overloaded or completely shut down and Amateur Radio operators use special frequencies to assist with disaster communications.

=== Specialized teams ===
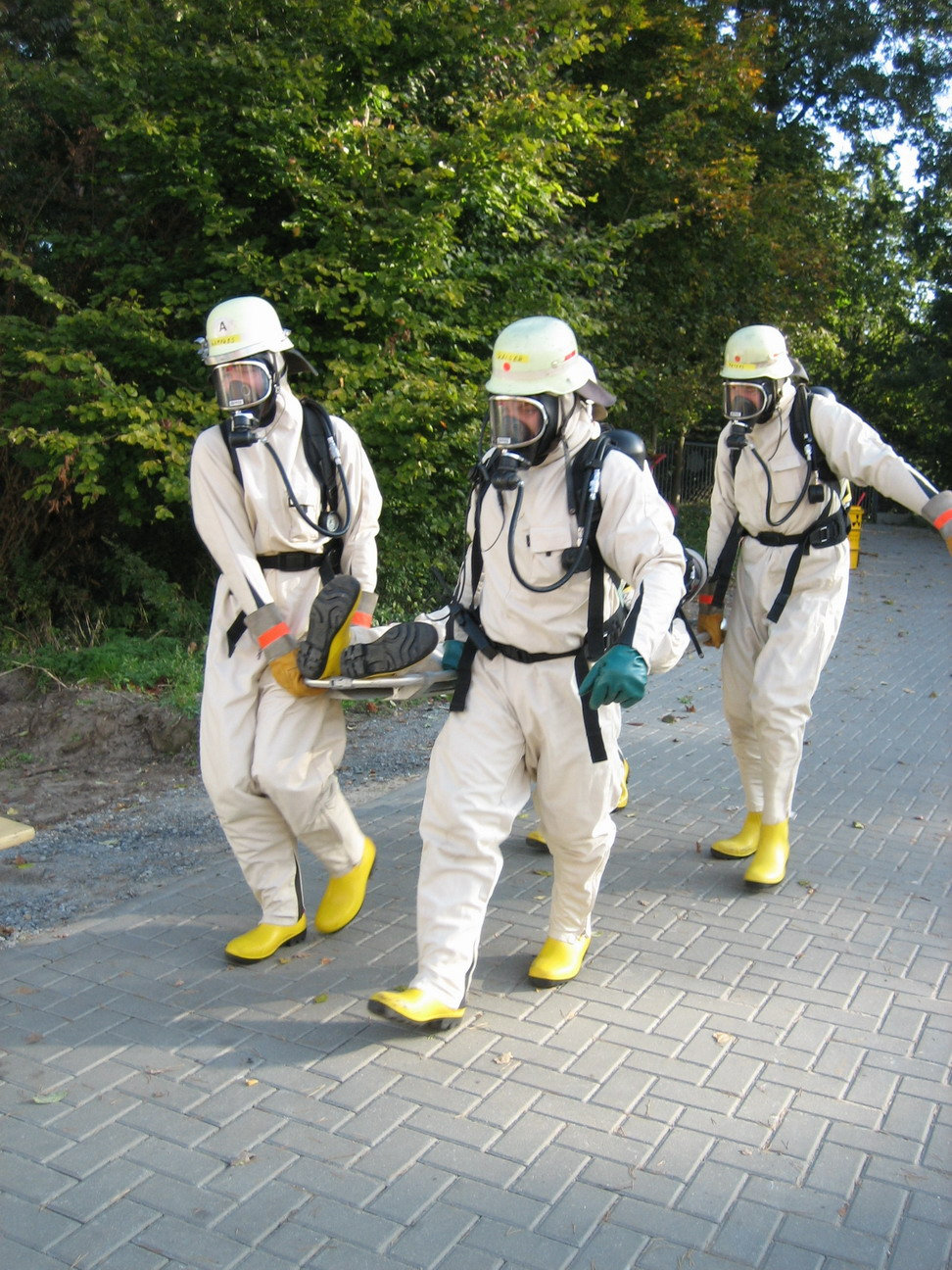
HazMat specialists in Level II/B protection suits training to carry a patient out of an incident zone to be decontaminated.

- Specialized rescue teams may be part of the local fire department; they may be associated with the state, provincial, or federal governments; or they may be privately operated teams. These teams are specialists in specific types of rescue, such as urban search and rescue (USAR), confined space rescue, or ski patrol.
- Hazmat teams are responsible for cleaning up and neutralizing any hazardous materials at the scene. Sometimes these will be specialized CBRNE (chemical, biological, radiological, nuclear and high-yield explosives) teams.
- National Guard units have medical responders specifically trained in mass casualty triage who may be called in to respond to a disaster-related incident.

=== Public services ===
- Railways and transportation agencies will be notified if an incident involves their tracks or right-of-way, or if they are required to cease operations in and through affected areas. Transportation agencies will provide buses to transport lightly injured people to the hospital. Buses can also provide shelter at the scene (for example, "warming buses") if required.
- The media play an important role in keeping the general public informed about the incident and in keeping them away from the incident area. It is recommended that a Public Information Officer be assigned as the only designated responder who communicates with the media, to prevent the spread of misinformation.
- Non-governmental organizations such as St. John Ambulance, the Order of Malta, the Red Cross, the Red Crescent, the Medical Reserve Corps, and the Salvation Army can provide assistance with all aspects of a mass casualty incident, including trained medical staff, vehicles, individual registration and tracking, temporary shelter, food service, and many other important services.

=== Hospitals ===
- Hospitals with emergency departments will have a mass casualty incident protocol which they initiate as soon as they are notified of an MCI in their community. They will have preparations in place to receive a massive number of casualties, like calling in more staff, pulling extra and spare equipment out of storage, and clearing non-acute patients out of the hospital. Some hospitals will send doctors to the scene of the incident to assist with triage, treatment, and transport of injured persons to the hospital.

==== Trauma centers ====
Trauma centers play a crucial role in the mass casualty incident timeline. A hospital can receive trauma center status by meeting specific criteria established by the American College of Surgeons (ACS) and passing a site review. Trauma centers have levels ranging from level 1 to level 4, with each level varying in different responsibilities and resources provided:

- Level 1: facilities that are able to offer complete care to the patients they receive, from initial care to seeing the individual all the way through rehabilitation.
- Level 2: facilities that are able to provide almost everything a level 1 facility offers except for tertiary care, such as complex neurosurgery.
- Level 3: facilities that have the ability to provide prompt assessment of a patient's injuries and respond quickly to decide whether they can perform the surgery or need to transport the individual to a level 1 or 2 facility.
- Level 4: facilities that are capable of performing advanced trauma life support, as well as providing a diagnostics assessment of the individual's injuries and transporting them to a higher level facility.

This is not an exhaustive list of agencies, and many other agencies and groups of people could be involved in a mass casualty incident.

== Flow ==
Ideally, once an MCI has been declared, a well-coordinated flow of events will occur, using three separate phases: triage, treatment, and transportation.

=== Triage ===
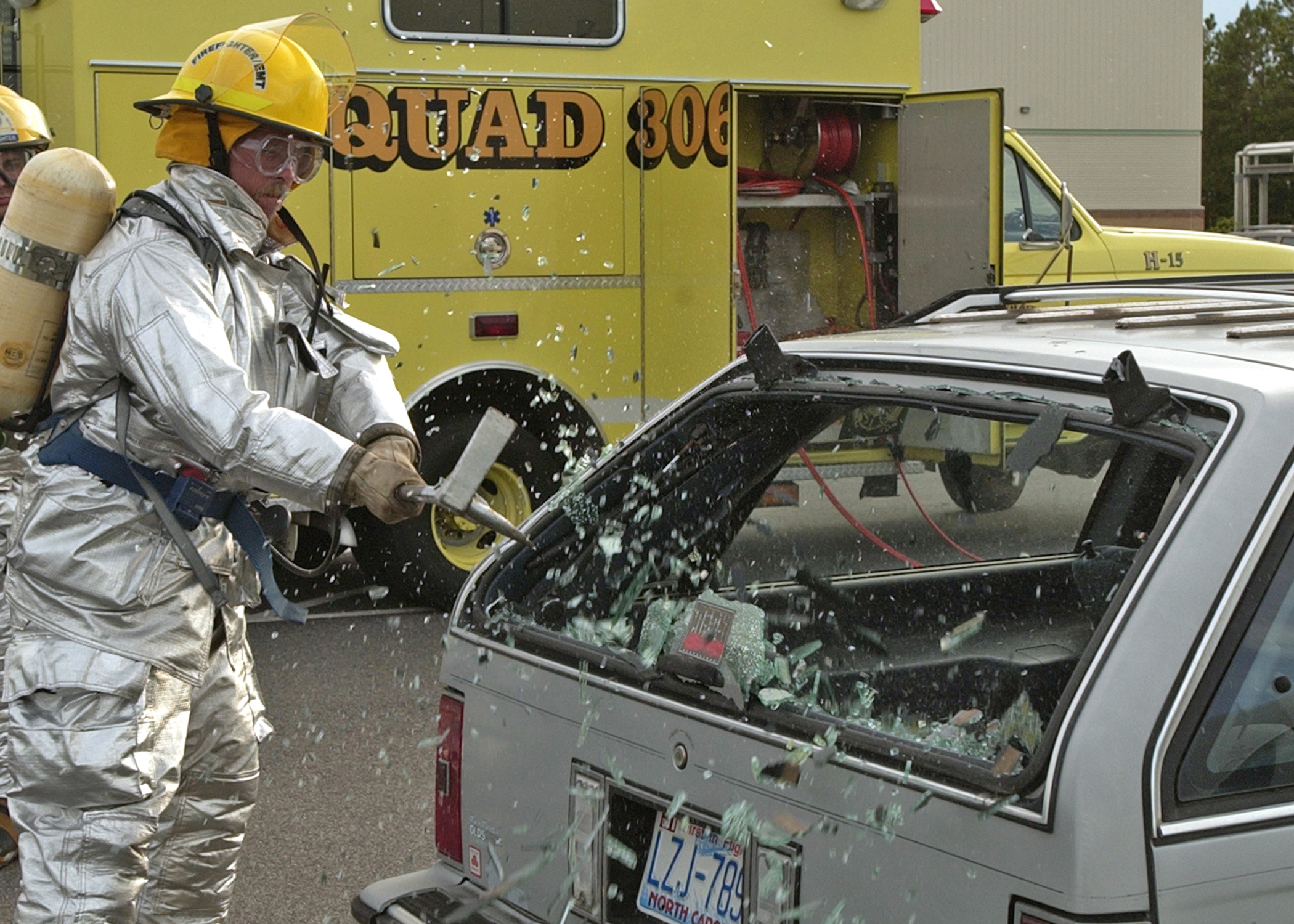
In an MCI drill aboard Naval Air Station Oceana, firefighter/EMT Greg Tetro breaks the rear glass of an automobile to rescue a trapped victim.

The first-arriving crew will conduct triage. Pre-hospital emergency triage generally consists of a check for immediate life-threatening concerns, usually lasting no more than one minute per patient. In North America, the START system (simple triage and rapid treatment) is the most common and is considered the easiest to use. Using START, the medical responder assigns each patient to one of four color-coded triage levels, based on their breathing, circulation, and mental status. The triage levels are:

- Immediate: Patients who have major life-threatening injuries, but are salvageable given the resources available
- Delayed: Patients who have non-life-threatening injuries, but are unable to walk or exhibit an altered mental status
- "Walking wounded": Patients who are able to ambulate out of the incident area to a treatment area
- Deceased or expectant: Used for victims who are dead, or whose injuries make survival unlikely.

Triage personnel do not conduct treatment, with the exception of:

- Airway maneuvers;
- Tourniquets for life-threatening hemorrhage; and
- Where allowed by local protocols, needle decompressions for tension pneumothoraces

Generally, a small group of responders, usually the first two or three crews on scene, can complete triage.

When responding to a chemical, biological, or radiological incident, the first-arriving crew must establish safety zones prior to entering the scene. Safety zones include:

- The hot zone: The contaminated area
- The warm zone: The area where HazMat specialists will decontaminate patients and fellow responders
- The cold zone: The safe zone, where any personnel who are not specially trained in HazMat and do not have chemical or biological protection gear must remain at all times. Depending on the contaminant, the cold zone should be roughly 200–300 yards from the incident, uphill and upwind. It should also be at least 50 yards uphill and upwind from the warm zone.

These zones should be clearly identified and with engineer tapes, lights, or cones. All responders and patients must leave the hot zone in designated pathways into the warm zone where they will be decontaminated. A designated officer should be posted at the hot zone and warm zone to make sure all contaminated personal are treated and decontaminated before entering the cold zone.

=== Treatment ===
Once casualties have been triaged, they can be moved to appropriate treatment areas. Unless a patient is green-tagged and ambulatory, litter bearers will have to transport patients from the incident scene to safer treatment areas located nearby. These treatment areas must always be within walking distance, and will be staffed by appropriate numbers of properly certified medical personnel and support people. The litter bearers do not have to be advanced medical personnel; their role is to simply place casualties onto carrying devices and transport them to the appropriate treatment area. Casualties should be transported in order of treatment priority: red-tagged patients first, followed by yellow-tagged, then green-tagged, and finally black-tagged.

Each colored triage category will have its own treatment area. Treatment areas are often defined by colored tarpaulins, flagging tape, signs, or tents. Upon arrival in the treatment area, the casualties are re-assessed and they are treated with the goal of stabilizing them until they can be transported to hospitals; transported to the morgue or medical examiner's office; or released.

==== Onsite morgue ====
Some mass casualty incidents require an onsite morgue to await transfer of bodies to a permanent morgue, when they must be removed to access injured victims or to keep them out of public sight and prevent heightening emotions further. They are usually far aside the incident, in an existing building or pitched tent.

=== Transport ===
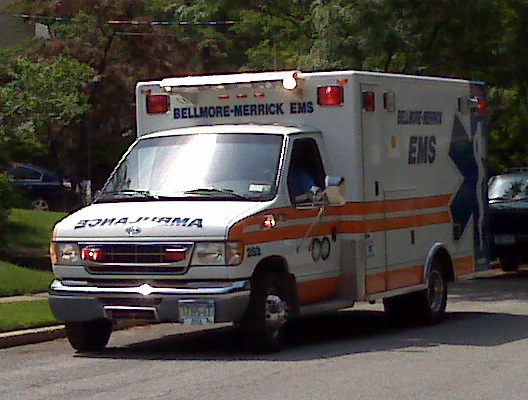
Ambulance on scene with emergency lights on

The final stage in the pre-hospital management of a mass casualty incident is the transport of casualties to hospitals for more definitive care. If the number of ambulances available is inadequate, other vehicles may transport patients, such as police cars, firetrucks, air ambulances, transit buses, or personal vehicles. As with treatment, transport priority is determined based on the severity of the patient's injuries. Usually, the most seriously injured are transported first, with the least serious transported only after all the critical patients have been transported.

In an effort to remove as many lightly injured civilians as possible, an incident commander may choose to have those least seriously injured transported to local hospitals or interim-care centers in order to provide more room for emergency personnel to work. It is also possible that lightly injured casualties will be transported first when access to those who are more severely injured will be delayed due to heavy or difficult rescue efforts.

== Definitive care ==
The care that is rendered at the scene of an MCI is usually only temporary and is designed to stabilize the casualties until they can receive more definitive care at a hospital or an interim-care center.

=== Interim-care center ===
An interim-care center is a temporary treatment center which allows for the assessment and treatment of patients until they can either be discharged or transported to a hospital. These are often placed in gymnasiums, schools, arenas, community centers, hotels, and or other locations that can support a field hospital setup. Permanent buildings are preferred to tents as they provide shelter, power, and running water, but many governments maintain complete field hospital setups that can be deployed anywhere within their jurisdiction within 12–24 hours. While full field hospitals require a significant amount of time to deploy (in relation to the length of most incidents), emergency personnel can set up temporary interim-care centers fairly quickly if needed using the personnel and resources they have on-hand. These centers are usually staffed by a combination of doctors, nurses, paramedics/emergency medical technicians, first responders, and social workers (for example, from the Red Cross), who work to get families reunited after a disaster.

=== Mass casualty event ===
Generally, in the healthcare field, the term "mass casualty event" (MCE) is used when hospital resources are overwhelmed by the number or severity of casualties. During these incidents, hospitals can discharge all fit patients, dedicate more resources to the emergency department, and expand their intensive care unit to accommodate anticipated long-term care needs. While up to 80% of victims will be transported from the scene to hospitals, others who are less injured might walk themselves to these facilities and increase the load at the closest facility to the incident.

MCEs can include epidemics, chemical emergencies, mass shootings, and natural disasters like weather.

== Demobilization ==
The final product of an MCI that happens to link up with the M.E.T.H.A.N.E. method is the act of demobilization which is crucial to the entire process. The demobilization process has to be in place from the beginning, once an area has been mobilized. This is critical, as a mass casualty incident can get out of hand quickly. Having everything planned out step-by-step can alleviate these concerns and help cover for the unexpected. The demobilization process also gives the local community and the corresponding agencies an idea for how long their city and specific areas will be consumed with emergency personnel and essentially blocked off. In many events, such as Hurricane Katrina, the demobilization process is not taken into account from the beginning. As a result, the process goes on much longer than necessary, which exacerbates financial costs, and puts a burden on local emergency and law enforcement services to uphold their everyday duties while also maintaining control of the mass casualty incident.

== See also ==
- ETHANE (mnemonic for the information to include when declaring an MCI)
- Incident Command System (ICS)
- National Incident Management System (NIMS)
- Orsec-Novi plan (French MCI plan)
- Pentagon MASCAL (an MCI drill in 2000)
- START triage

== Bibliography ==
- Marx, John A. Marx (2014). Rosen's Emergency Medicine: Concepts and clinical practice (8th ed.). Philadelphia, PA: Elsevier/Saunders. pp. Chapter. ISBN 978-1455706051.
- Mattox, Kenneth (2013). Trauma (7th ed.). McGraw-Hill Education. ISBN 978-0071663519.
- Trunkey, Donald (2008). Current Therapy of Trauma and Surgical Critical Care (1st ed.). Philadelphia: Mosby. ISBN 978-0-323-04418-9.
- "Activating A Mass Casualty Response". DelValle Institute Knowledge Base. DelValle Institute for Emergency Preparedness. Archived from the original on 1 September 2017.
- "Incident Command System Resources". FEMA. United States Department of Homeland Security. 6 November 2016. Archived from the original on 30 April 2017.
- "Trauma Center Levels Explained". America Trauma Society. American Trauma Society.
