= Thunderclap headache =

Severe and sudden-onset headache

- Other names: Lone acute severe headache
- Specialty: Neurology

A thunderclap headache is a headache that is severe and has a sudden onset. It is defined as a severe headache that takes seconds to minutes to reach maximum intensity. Although approximately 75% are attributed to "primary" headaches—headache disorder, non-specific headache, idiopathic thunderclap headache, or uncertain headache disorder—the remainder are secondary to other causes, which can include some extremely dangerous acute conditions, as well as infections and other conditions. Usually, further investigations are performed to identify the underlying cause.

== Signs and symptoms ==
A headache is called "thunderclap headache" if it is severe in character and reaches maximum severity within seconds to minutes of onset. In many cases, there are no other abnormalities, but the various causes of thunderclap headaches may lead to a number of neurological symptoms.

== Causes ==
Approximately 75% are attributed to "primary" headaches: headache disorder, non-specific headache, idiopathic thunderclap headache or uncertain headache disorder. The remainder are secondary to a number of conditions, including:

- Subarachnoid hemorrhage (10–25% of all cases of thunderclap headache)
- Cerebral venous sinus thrombosis
- Cervical artery dissection
- Hypertensive emergency (severely raised blood pressure)
- Spontaneous intracranial hypotension (unexplained low cerebrospinal fluid pressure)
- Stroke (headache occurs in about 25% of strokes but usually not thunderclap character)
- Retroclival hematoma (hematoma behind the clivus in the skull, usually due to physical trauma but sometimes spontaneous)
- Pituitary apoplexy (infarction or hemorrhage of the pituitary gland)
- Colloid cyst of the third ventricle
- Meningitis, sinusitis
- Reversible cerebral vasoconstriction syndrome (previously Call-Fleming syndrome, several subtypes)
- Primary cough headache, primary exertional headache, and primary sexual headache

The most important of the secondary causes are subarachnoid hemorrhage, cerebral venous sinus thrombosis, and dissection of an artery in the neck.

In subarachnoid hemorrhage, there may be syncope (transient loss of consciousness), seizures, meningism (neck pain and stiffness), visual symptoms, and vomiting. 50–70% of people with subarachnoid hemorrhage have an isolated headache without decreased level of consciousness. The headache typically persists for several days.

Cerebral venous sinus thrombosis, thrombosis of the veins of the brain, usually causes a headache that reflects raised intracranial pressure and is therefore made worse by anything that makes the pressure rise further, such as coughing. In 2–10% of cases, the headache is of thunderclap character. In most cases there are other neurological abnormalities, such as seizures and weakness of part of the body, but in 15–30% the headache is the only abnormality.

Carotid artery dissection and vertebral artery dissection (together cervical artery dissection), in which a tear forms inside the wall of the blood vessels that supply the brain, often causes pain on the affected side of the head or neck. The pain usually precedes other problems that are caused by impaired blood flow through the artery into the brain; these may include visual symptoms, weakness of part of the body, and other abnormalities depending on the vessel affected.

== Diagnosis ==
The most important initial investigation is computed tomography of the brain, which is very sensitive for subarachnoid hemorrhage. If this is normal, a lumbar puncture is performed, as a small proportion of SAH is missed on CT and can still be detected as xanthochromia.

If both investigations are normal, the specific description of the headache and the presence of other abnormalities may prompt further tests, usually involving magnetic resonance imaging (MRI). Magnetic resonance angiography (MRA) may be useful in identifying problems with the arteries (such as dissection), and magnetic resonance venography (MRV) identifies venous thrombosis. It is not usually necessary to proceed to cerebral angiography, a more precise but invasive investigation of the brain's blood vessels, if MRA and MRV are normal.

== Epidemiology ==
Incidence of thunderclap headache has been estimated at 43 per 100,000 people every year. Approximately 75% are attributed to "primary" headaches: headache disorder, non-specific headache, idiopathic thunderclap headache or uncertain headache disorder. The remainder is attributed to secondary causes: vascular problems, infections and various other conditions.

== History ==
The importance of severe headaches in the diagnosis of subarachnoid hemorrhage has been known since the 1920s, when London neurologist Charles Symonds described the clinical syndrome. The term "thunderclap headache" was introduced in 1986 in a report by John Day and Neil Raskin, neurologists at the University of California, San Francisco, in a report of a 42-year-old woman who had experienced several sudden headaches and was found to have an aneurysm that had not ruptured.
