= RPLS =

RPLS may refer to:

- Registered Professional Land Surveyor, a licensed surveyor in the United States
- Reversible posterior leukoencephalopathy syndrome, a syndrome characterized by headache, confusion, seizures and visual loss
- The ICAO code for Danilo Atienza Air Base
