= Cerebral vasculitis =

- Other names: Central nervous system vasculitis
- Specialty: Cardiology, neurology, rheumatology

Cerebral vasculitis (sometimes the word angiitis is used instead of "vasculitis") is vasculitis (inflammation of the blood vessel wall) involving the brain and occasionally the spinal cord. It affects all of the vessels: very small blood vessels (capillaries), medium-size blood vessels (arterioles and venules), or large blood vessels (arteries and veins). If blood flow in a vessel with vasculitis is reduced or stopped, the parts of the body that receive blood from that vessel begins to die, resulting in a stroke. It may produce a wide range of neurological symptoms, such as headache, skin rashes, feeling very tired, joint pains, difficulty moving or coordinating part of the body, changes in sensation, and alterations in perception, thought or behavior, as well as the phenomena of a mass lesion in the brain leading to coma and herniation. Some of its signs and symptoms may resemble multiple sclerosis. 10% have associated bleeding in the brain.

== Signs and symptoms ==
The most frequent presenting signs and symptoms of primary CNS vasculitis were focal neurological deficits (seen in 63% of cases), headaches (51%) and cognitive impairment (41%). Other presenting symptoms include aphasia or other difficulties with speech (35-43%), ataxia, visual field deficits, acute or subacute encephalopathy (which may progress to coma), and seizures (16-33%). Spinal cord involvement is rare, especially spinal cord involvement that does not also affect the brain.

== Causes ==
"Primary" angiitis/vasculitis of the central nervous system (PACNS) is said to be present if there is no secondary cause. The exact mechanism of the primary disease is unknown. Possible secondary causes of cerebral vasculitis are infections such as with varicella zoster virus (chicken pox or shingles), systemic auto-immune diseases such as systemic lupus erythematosus (SLE) and rheumatoid arthritis, medications and drugs (amphetamine, cocaine and heroin), some forms of cancer (lymphomas, leukemia and lung cancer) and other forms of systemic vasculitis such as granulomatosis with polyangiitis, polyarteritis nodosa or Behçet's disease which, in addition to causing systemic vasculitis, also affect the brain or spinal cord. It may imitate, and is in turn imitated by, a number of other diseases that affect the blood vessels of the brain diffusely such as fibromuscular dysplasia and thrombotic thrombocytopenic purpura.

Primary CNS vasculitis has an incidence of 2.4 cases per 1 million people, with an associated mortality of 8-23% and a 25% risk of severe disability. Older age or cognitive impairment at diagnosis, the presence of cerebral infarctions on imaging (stroke), spinal cord involvement, delays in diagnosis and involvement of the medium and large vessels are associated with a poor prognosis and increased mortality in primary CNS vasculitis.

== Pathophysiology ==
Based on biopsy, there are three main types of blood vessel inflammation seen in primary CNS vasculitis. Granulomatous vasculitis (present in 32-61% of cases) presents with well formed granulomas with multi-nucleated giant cells in the blood vessel wall. Lymphocytic vasculitis (24-79% of cases) involves lymphocytic infiltration of blood vessel walls without granulomas. It is associated with less disability and mortality. Necrotizing vasculitis (14-42% of cases) involves transmural (involving the entire blood vessel wall) fibrinoid necrosis. This type is associated with a high risk of intracerebral hemorrhage.

== Diagnosis ==
Diagnosis of primary CNS vasculitis may be made with brain imaging and biopsy of the affected blood vessel. The most definitive diagnostic modality is a biopsy of the affected blood vessel however brain biopsy has a low yield, with up to 30-50% of biopsies being normal in suspected cases. This is due to some cases having an irregular distribution of vessel involvement (making biopsy technically difficult) or larger vessels being unable to be biopsied due to the risk of bleeding.

Digital subtraction angiography is the preferred imaging modality in suspected cases of primary CNS vasculitis and has greater specificity than magnetic resonance angiography or CT angiography (which have reduced accuracy for assessment of luminal irregularities of medium-sized vessels or the posterior circulation of the brain). Typical findings on angiography include smooth wall segmental stenosis of multiple arteriessometimes with post-stenosis dilation or bleeding. In cases involving small vessels, angiography is usually normal and a biopsy is needed to confirm the diagnosis. European guidelines recommend performing a biopsy in suspected cases of small vessel disease with normal angiography. In cases of medium to large vessel disease, with characteristic imaging findings on angiography, a biopsy is usually not required. Biopsy and angiography do not have a high concordance in diagnosis, and in one meta analysis digital subtraction angiography was positive in only 33% of biopsy confirmed disease and biopsy was positive in only 8% of angiographically confirmed cases.

High resolution MRI may show hyperenhancement of the blood vessel walls in primary CNS vasculitis and may help to distinguish the lesions form atherosclerotic plaques or reversible cerebral vasoconstriction syndrome which have similar morphology on angiography. MRI usually also shows multiple infarcts, enhancement of the leptomeninges (the lining of the brain) and various parts of the brain and intracranial hemorrhages, sometimes microhemorrhages. A normal MRI makes the diagnosis unlikely.

Inflammatory markers such as C-reactive protein (CRP) and erythrocyte sedimentation rate (ESR) are usually normal. And analysis of the cerebrospinal fluid shows a non-specific pattern with mildly elevated leukocytes and increased protein, especially in small vessel disease.

== Treatment ==
Glucocorticoids and the immunosuppressant cyclophosphamide are the mainstays of treatment of primary CNS vasculitis. There is also limited evidence for the use of mycophenolate mofetil. The treatment is usually done with an induction phase followed by at least 2 years of maintenance therapy. Immunosuppressants Rituximab or tocilizumab may be used for refractory disease. 75% of people have a favorable response to therapy. European guidelines recommend aspirin being added on as an adjunct therapy for those with medium or large vessel involvement. Maintenance therapy was associated with lower deaths, lower risk of relapse, less disability and European guidelines recommend at least 2 years of maintenance therapy after induction.

== Prognosis ==
With therapy 21-66% will go into long term remission with 12-59% of patients having subsequent flares or recurrence. 46-73% of patients had good residual neurological function (as measured by Rankin scores) after treatment.
