= Pseudosubarachnoid hemorrhage =

Condition resmbling subarachnoid hemorrhage on CT scan

A pseudosubarachnoid hemorrhage is an apparent increased attenuation on CT scans within the basal cisterns that mimics a true subarachnoid hemorrhage. This occurs in cases of severe cerebral edema, such as by cerebral hypoxia. It may also occur due to intrathecally administered contrast material, leakage of high-dose intravenous contrast material into the subarachnoid spaces, or in patients with cerebral venous sinus thrombosis, severe meningitis, leptomeningeal carcinomatosis, intracranial hypotension, cerebellar infarctions, or bilateral subdural hematomas.

In a true subarachnoid hemorrhage, there is higher attenuation on CT scans of the basal cisterns, and blood that has leaked from a vessel or formed a hematoma is more highly attenuated due to the absorption of plasma. Pseudosubarachnoid hemorrhages have been observed in as much as 20% of patients resuscitated from non-traumatic cardiopulmonary arrest. Patients with pseudosubarachnoid hemorrhages may have worse prognoses than those with true subarachnoid hemorrhages because of underlying disease processes and decreased cerebral perfusion with elevated intracranial pressure. The identification of a pseudosubarachnoid hemorrhage as opposed to a true subarachnoid hemorrhage may therefore change a patient's treatment plan.
