= PRES =

PRES can be short for:

- Pôle de recherche et d'enseignement supérieur
- Posterior reversible encephalopathy syndrome
- Pregnenolone sulfate (more commonly called PregS)
- PRES, Glossing abbreviation for present tense
