= RCVS =

RCVS may refer to:

- Royal College of Veterinary Surgeons
- Reversible cerebral vasoconstriction syndrome
