= Reversible cerebral vasoconstriction syndrome =

- Specialty: Neurology

Reversible cerebral vasoconstriction syndrome (RCVS, sometimes called Call-Fleming syndrome) is a disease characterized by a weeks-long course of thunderclap headaches, sometimes focal neurologic signs, and occasionally seizures. Symptoms are thought to arise from transient abnormalities in the blood vessels of the brain. In some cases, it may be associated with childbirth, vasoactive or illicit drug use, or complications of pregnancy. If it occurs after delivery it may be referred to as postpartum cerebral angiopathy.

For the vast majority of patients, all symptoms disappear on their own within three weeks. Deficits persist in a small minority of patients, with severe complications or death being very rare. Because symptoms resemble a variety of life-threatening conditions, differential diagnosis is necessary.

== Signs and symptoms ==
The key symptom of RCVS is recurrent thunderclap headaches, which over 95% of patients experience. In two-thirds of cases, it is the only symptom. These headaches are typically bilateral, very severe and peak in intensity within a minute. They may last from minutes to days, and may be accompanied by nausea, photophobia, phonophobia or vomiting. Some patients experience only one headache, but on average there are four attacks over a period of one to four weeks. A milder, residual headache persists between severe attacks for half of patients.

1–17% of patients experience seizures. 8–43% of patients show neurologic problems, especially visual disturbances, but also hemiplegia, ataxia, dysarthria, aphasia, and numbness. These neurologic issues typically disappear within minutes or a few hours; more persistent symptoms may indicate a stroke. Posterior reversible encephalopathy syndrome is present in a small minority of patients.

This condition features the unique property that the patient's cerebral arteries can spontaneously constrict and relax back and forth over a period of time without intervention and without clinical findings. Vasospasm is common post subarachnoid hemorrhage and cerebral aneurysm, but in RCVS only 25% of patients have symptoms post subarachnoid hemorrhage.

== Causes ==
The direct cause of the symptoms is believed to be either constriction or dilation of blood vessels in the brain. The pathogenesis is not known definitively, and the condition is likely to result from multiple different disease processes.

Up to two-thirds of RCVS cases are associated with an underlying condition or exposure, particularly vasoactive or recreational drug use, complications of pregnancy (eclampsia and pre-eclampsia), and the adjustment period following childbirth called puerperium. Vasoactive drug use is found in about 50% of cases. Implicated drugs include selective serotonin reuptake inhibitors, weight-loss pills such as Hydroxycut, alpha-sympathomimetic decongestants, acute migraine medications, pseudoephedrine, epinephrine, cocaine, and cannabis, among many others. It sometimes follows blood transfusions, certain surgical procedures, swimming, bathing, high altitude experiences, sexual activity, exercise, or coughing. Symptoms can take days or a few months to manifest after a trigger.

Following a study and publication in 2007, it is also thought SSRIs, uncontrolled hypertension, endocrine abnormality, and neurosurgical trauma are indicated to potentially cause vasospasm.

== Diagnosis ==
The clinician should first rule out conditions with similar symptoms, such as subarachnoid hemorrhage, ischemic stroke, pituitary apoplexy, cerebral artery dissection, meningitis, and spontaneous cerebrospinal fluid leak. This may involve a CT scan, lumbar puncture, MRI, and other tests. Posterior reversible encephalopathy syndrome has a similar presentation, and is found in 10–38% of RCVS patients.

RCVS is diagnosed by detecting diffuse reversible cerebral vasoconstriction. Catheter angiography is ideal, but computed tomography angiography and magnetic resonance angiography can identify about 70% of cases. Multiple angiographies may be necessary. Because other diseases (such as atherosclerosis) have similar angiographic presentations, it can only be conclusively diagnosed if vasoconstriction resolves within 12 weeks.

== Treatment ==
As of 2014, no treatment strategy has yet been investigated in a randomized clinical trial. Verapamil, nimodipine, and other calcium channel blockers may help reduce the intensity and frequency of the headaches. A clinician may recommend rest and the avoidance of activities or vasoactive drugs which trigger symptoms (see § Causes). Analgesics and anticonvulsants can help manage pain and seizures, respectively.

== Prognosis ==
All symptoms normally resolve within three weeks, and may only last days. Permanent deficits are seen in a minority of patients, ranging from under 10% to 20% in various studies. Less than 5% of patients experience progressive vasoconstriction, which can lead to stroke, progressive cerebral edema, or even death. Severe complications appear to be more common in postpartum mothers.

== Epidemiology ==
The incidence of RCVS is unknown, but it is believed to be "not uncommon", and likely under-diagnosed. One small, possibly biased study found that the condition was eventually diagnosed in 45% of outpatients with sudden headache, and 46% of outpatients with thunderclap headache.

The average age of onset is 42, but RCVS has been observed in patients aged from 19 months to 70 years. Children are rarely affected. It is more common in females, with a female-to-male ratio of 2.4:1.

== History ==
Case studies of the condition first appeared in the 1960s, but it was not then recognized as a distinct entity. In 1983, French researchers published a case series of 11 patients, terming the condition acute benign cerebral angiopathy. Gregory Call and Marie Fleming were the first two authors of a report in which doctors from Massachusetts General Hospital, led by C. Miller Fisher, described four patients, alongside 12 previous case studies, with the characteristic symptoms and abnormal cerebral angiogram findings. The name Call-Fleming syndrome refers to these researchers.

A 2007 review by Leonard Calabrese and colleagues proposed the name reversible cerebral vasoconstriction syndrome, which has since gained widespread acceptance. This name merges various conditions that were previously treated as distinct entities, including Call-Fleming syndrome, postpartum angiopathy, and drug-induced angiopathy. Other names may still be used for particular forms of the condition.

== See also ==
- ru:Преходящее нарушение мозгового кровообращения
