= Cerebral angiography =

Angiography that produces images of blood vessels in and around the brain

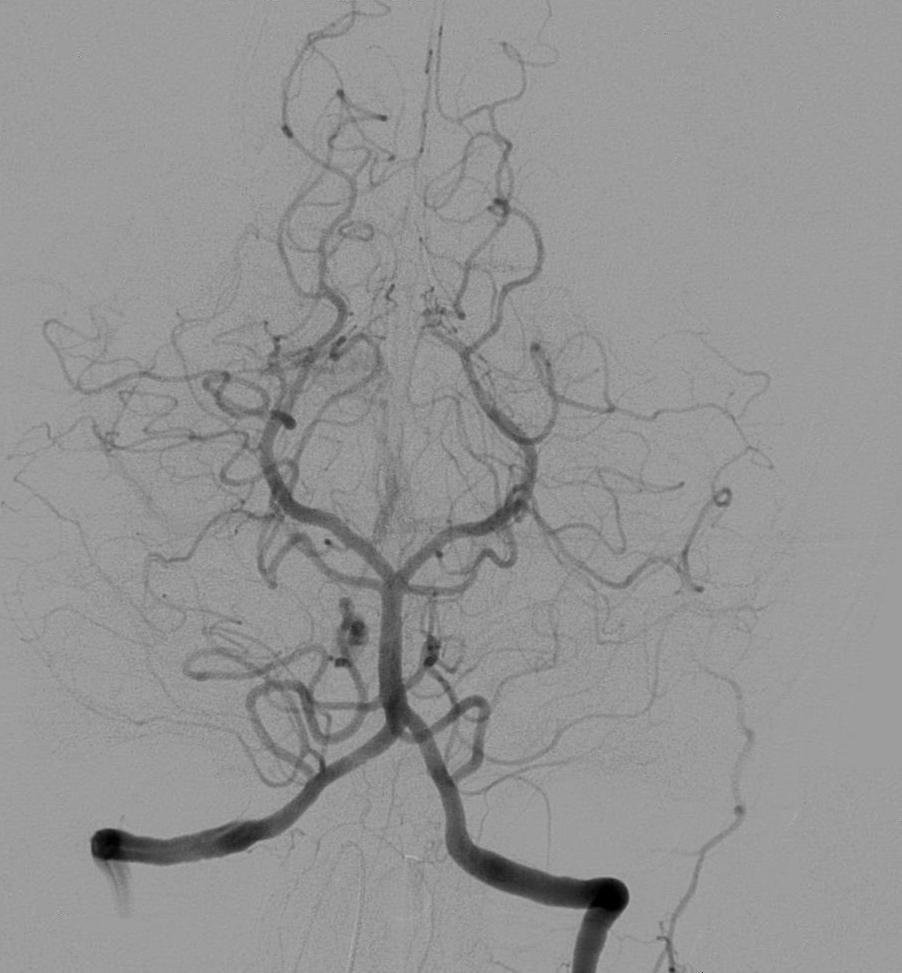
- Cerebral angiogram showing a transverse projection of the vertebrobasilar and posterior cerebral circulation.
- ICD-9-CM: 88.41
- MeSH: D002533
- MedlinePlus: 003799

Cerebral angiography is a form of angiography which provides images of blood vessels in and around the brain, thereby allowing detection of abnormalities such as arteriovenous malformations and aneurysms. It was pioneered in 1927 by the Portuguese neurologist Egas Moniz at the University of Lisbon, who also helped develop thorotrast for use in the procedure.

Typically a catheter is inserted into a large artery (such as the femoral artery) and threaded through the circulatory system to the carotid artery, where a contrast agent is injected. A series of radiographs are taken as the contrast agent spreads through the brain's arterial system, then a second series as it reaches the venous system.

For some applications, cerebral angiography may yield better images than less invasive methods such as computed tomography angiography and magnetic resonance angiography. In addition, cerebral angiography allows certain treatments to be performed immediately, based on its findings. In recent decades, cerebral angiography has so assumed a therapeutic connotation thanks to the elaboration of endovascular therapeutic techniques. Embolization (a minimally invasive surgical technique) over time has played an increasingly significant role in the multimodal treatment of cerebral MAVs, facilitating subsequent microsurgical or radiosurgical treatment. Another type of treatment possible by angiography (if the images reveal an aneurysm) is the introduction of metal coils through the catheter already in place and maneuvered to the site of aneurysm; over time these coils encourage formation of connective tissue at the site, strengthening the vessel walls.

Prior to the advent of modern neuroimaging techniques such as MRI and CT in the mid-1970s, cerebral angiographies were frequently employed as a tool to infer the existence and location of certain kinds of lesions and hematomas by looking for secondary vascular displacement caused by the mass effect related to these medical conditions. This use of angiography as an indirect assessment tool is nowadays obsolete as modern non-invasive diagnostic methods are available to image many kinds of primary intracranial abnormalities directly. It is still widely used however for evaluating various types of vascular pathologies within the skull.

== Uses ==
Cerebral angiography is used for diagnosis but may be followed by treatment procedures in the same setting. Cerebral angiography is used to image various intracranial (within the head) or extracranial (outside the head) diseases.

Intracranial diseases are: non-traumatic subarachnoid haemorrhage, non-traumatic intracerebral haemorrhage, intracranial aneurysm, stroke, cerebral vasospasm, cerebral arteriovenous malformation (for Spetzler-Martin grading and plan for intervention), dural arteriovenous fistula, embolisation of brain tumours such as meningioma, cavernous sinus haemangioma, for Wada test, and to obtain haemodynamics of cerebral blood flow such as cross flow, circulation time, and collateral flow.

Extracranial diseases are: Subclavian steal syndrome, rupture of the carotid artery, carotid artery stenosis, cervical spine trauma, epistaxis (nose bleeding) and plan for embolisation of juvenile nasopharyngeal angiofibroma before operation.

Although computed tomography angiography (CTA) and Magnetic resonance angiography (MRA) has been used widely in evaluation of intracranial disease, cerebral angiography provides higher resolution on the conditions of blood vessel lumens and vasculature. Cerebral angiography is also the standard of detecting intracranial aneurysm and evaluating the feasibility of endovascular coiling. Performing a cerebral angiogram by gaining access through the femoral artery or radial artery is feasible in order to treat cerebral aneurysms with a number of devices

Certain conditions such as contrast allergy, renal insufficiency, and coagulation disorders are contraindicated in this procedure.

== Technique ==
Before the procedure, focused history and neurological examination is performed, available imaging, and blood parameters are reviewed. When reviewing imaging, arch anatomy and variants are evaluated to select suitable catheters to assess the vessels. Complete blood count is reviewed to ensure adequate amount of haemoglobin in subject's body, and to rule out the presence of sepsis. Serum creatinine is assessed to rule out renal dysfunction. Meanwhile, prothrombin time is assessed to rule out coagulopathy. Informed consent regarding the risks of the procedure is taken. Anticoagulants are withheld if possible. Fasting is required 6 hours before the procedure and insulin requirement is reduced by half for those diabetics who are fasting. Bilateral groins (for femoral artery access) and left arm/forearm (for brachial artery/radial artery access) are prepared. Neurological status of the patient before sedation or anesthesia is recorded.

Sedation drug such as intravenous midazolam and painkiller such as fentanyl can be used if the subject is restless or painful. The subject is then lie down on supine position with arm at the sides. Uncooperative subjects may have their forehead tapped to reduce motion. The subject is advised to stay as still as possible especially when fluoroscopy images are taken. The subject is also advised to avoid swallowing when images of neck are taken. These measures are taken to reduce motion artifact in the images.

Right common femoral artery (RFA) is the preferred site of access. If RFA access is not optimal, then brachial artery access is chosen. Either a micropuncture system or an 18G access needle can be used with or without ultrasound guidance. There are four types of catheters that can be used: angled vertebral catheter for usual cases, Judkins right coronary catheter (Terumo) for tortuous vessels, Simmons's catheter and Mani's head hunter catheter (Terumo) for extremely tortuous vessels. A 5Fr sheath is also placed within and flushed with heparinised saline to prevent clotting around the sheath. In terms of guidewire, Terumo hydrophilic Glidewire 0.035 inches can be used.

To prevent embolism (either due to blood clot or air embolism, "double flush" and "wet connect" techniques are used. In "double flush" technique, a saline syringe is used to aspirate blood from the catheter. Then, a second heparinised saline syringe is used to flush the catheter. "Wet connect" is the technique that connects syringe to a sheath without air bubbles within.

Digital subtraction angiography is the main technique of imaging the cerebral blood vessels. Catheter should be advanced over the guidewire. Rotating the catheter during advancement is also helpful. Roadmap (superimposing previous image on live fluoroscopic image) is used to advance catheters or guidewires before any vessel bifurcation can help to prevent vessel dissection. After the catheter is in position, guidewire is removed slowly with heparinised saline dripping into the catheter at the same time to prevent air embolism. Prior to contrast injection, backflow of the catheter should be established to ensure there is no wedging, dissection, or intracatheter clotting. During the catheterisation of vertebral artery, extra care should be taken to prevent vessel dissection or vasospasm. Delayed or incomplete contrast washout may indicate vasospasm or dissection.

=== Radiographic views ===
Cervical arch angiogram is taken if there is any suspicion of aortic arch narrowing, or any anatomical variants such as bovine arch (brachiocephalic trunk shares a common origin with left common carotid artery). If such abnormality is present, it results it difficulty in cannulation of the main branches of the aortic arch. The catheter of choice to cannulate this area is pigtail catheter with multiple side holes. Contrast injection rate of 20 to 25ml/sec is given with total volume of 40 to 50 ml of contrast. The frame rate of fluoroscopy is 4 to 6 frames per second. The image is taken in with the x-ray tube in left anterior oblique position.

To image the vessels of the neck such as common carotid, internal and external carotid arteries, AP, lateral, and 45 degrees bilateral oblique positions are taken. Contrast injection rate is 3 to 4 ml/sec with total volume of 7 to 9 ml. The frame rate of fluoroscopy is 3 to 4 frames/sec.

To image the anterior cerebral circulation such as internal and external carotid arteries and its branches, AP, Towne's and lateral views are taken. The petrous part of the temporal bone should be superimposed at the mid or lower orbits when taking the AP/Towne's view. Contrast injection rate is 6 to 7 ml/sec with total volume of contrast at 10 ml. The frame rate of fluoroscopy is 2 to 4 frames/sec. Neck extension can help to navigate into the tortuous cervical part of the internal carotid artery.

At the level of carotid bifurcation, AP and oblique images are taken. At the cavernous (C4) and ophthalmic segments (C6) of the internal carotid artery, Caldwell and lateral views are taken. At the supraclinoid segment (C5-clinoid, C6-ophthalmic, and C7-bifurcation to posterior communicating artery (PCOM) segments), AP view is used to access the terminal branches such as anterior cerebral artery (ACA), middle cerebral artery (MCA) while oblique view (25 to 35 degrees) is used to access the ACA, anterior communicating artery (ACOM), and MCA bifurcations. Lateral view is useful to visualise the PCOM while submentovertical view is useful to project ACOM above the nasal cavity, thus making it easier to access the anatomy of ACOM. Transorbital oblique view is useful to access the MCA anatomy.

The anatomy of external carotid artery is access via AP and lateral views.

To image the posterior circulation, such as vertebral and basilar arteries, AP, Towne's view, lateral projections near the back of the head and upper part of the neck is taken. In this case, petrous bone should be projected at the bottom or below the orbits to visualise the basilar artery and its branches in AP/Towne's view. The rate of injection is 3 to 5 ml/sec, for a total of 8ml. The fluoroscope will be catching images at a rate of 2 to 4 frames per second. Posterior cerebral artery (PCA) can be seen in AP view. The left vertebral artery is easier to cannulate than the right vertebral because of the straightforward anatomy of the left vertebral artery.

Any activation of primary collateral system (ACOM and PCOM arteries) or secondary collateral system (pial-pial and leptomeningeal-dural) in case of occlusion of internal carotid artery should also be documented. Leptomeningeal collaterals or pial collaterals are the small arterial connections that join the terminal branches of ACAs, MCAs, and PCAs on the surface of the brain.

=== Post-procedural care ===
Manual compression or percutaneous closure device can be used to stop the bleeding from common femoral artery. Groin haematoma should be monitored during intensive care unit (ICU) monitoring. The puncture should be immobilised (to prevent movement) for 24 hours post puncture. Neurological examination should be performed and new neurological deficit should be documented. Significant neurological changes should be evaluated with MRI scan or a repeat cerebral angiography to rule out acute stroke or vessel dissection. Painkiller should be administered if there is any puncture site pain.

== Complications ==
The most common complication is groin haematoma which occurs in 4% of those affected. Neurologic complications such as transient ischemic attack in 2.5% of the cases. There is also the risk of stroke with permanent neurological defect in 0.1% of the cases and may lead to death in 0.06%. Rarely, 0.3 to 1% of the cases experience cortical blindness from 3 minutes to 12 hours after the procedure. It is a condition where those affected experienced loss of vision with normal pupillary light reflex, and normal extraocular muscles movement. The condition can sometimes be accompanied by headaches, mental state changes, and memory losses.

Some risk factors of complications are if the subject is having subarachnoid haemorrhage, atherosclerotic cerebrovascular disease, frequent transient ischemic attacks, age more than 55 years, and poorly controlled diabetes. Besides, longer procedures, increased in number of catheter exchanges, and the use of larger size of catheters also increases the risk of complications.

== History ==
In 1896, E. Haschek and O.T. Lindenthal in Vienna, Austria, reported angiography of blood vessels by taking a series of X-rays after injecting a mixture of petroleum, quicklime, and mercuric sulfide into the hand of a cadaver.

Cerebral angiography was first described by Egas Moniz, a Portuguese physician and politician, in 1927. He performed this procedure on six patients. Two developed Horner's syndrome due to leaking of contrast material around the carotid artery, one developed temporary aphasia, and another died due to thromboembolism to the anterior circulation of the brain.

Prior to the 1970s the typical technique involved a needle puncture directly into the carotid artery, as depicted in the 1973 horror film The Exorcist, which was replaced by the current method of threading a catheter from a distant artery due to common complications caused by trauma to the artery at the puncture site in the neck (particularly hematomas of the neck, with possible compromission of the airway).
