= Subarachnoid hemorrhage =

Bleeding into the brain's subarachnoid space

- Other names: Subarachnoid haemorrhage
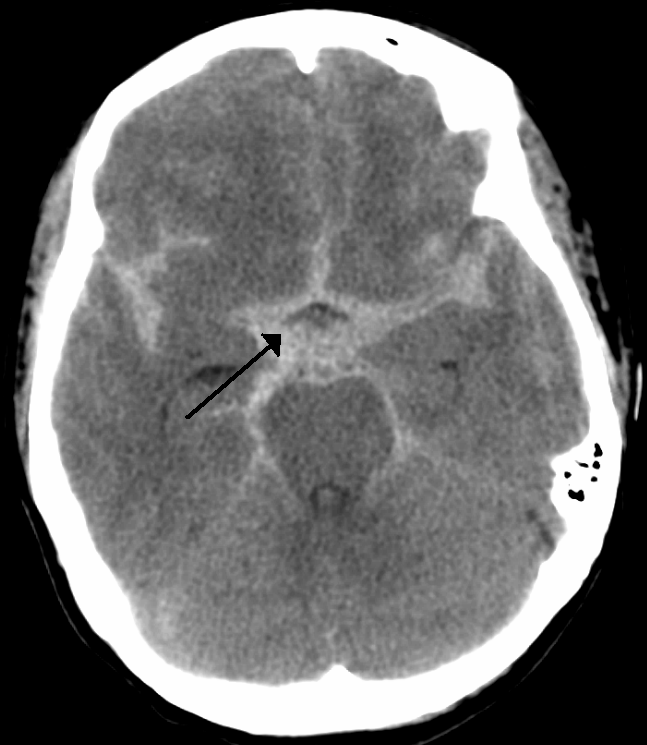
- CT scan of the brain showing subarachnoid hemorrhage as a white area in the center (marked by the arrow) and stretching into the sulci to either side
- Pronunciation: /ˌsʌbəˈræknɔɪd ˈhɛmərɪdʒ/
- Specialty: Neurosurgery, Neurology, Emergency medicine
- Symptoms: Severe headache of rapid onset, vomiting, decreased level of consciousness
- Complications: Delayed cerebral ischemia, cerebral vasospasm, seizures
- Types: Traumatic, spontaneous (aneurysmal, nonaneurysmal, perimesencephalic)
- Causes: Head injury, cerebral aneurysm
- Risk factors: High blood pressure, smoking, alcoholism, cocaine
- Diagnostic method: CT scan, lumbar puncture
- Differential diagnosis: Meningitis, migraine, cerebral venous sinus thrombosis
- Treatment: Neurosurgery or radiologically guided interventions
- Medication: Labetalol, nimodipine
- Prognosis: 45% risk of death at 30 days (aneurysmal)
- Frequency: 1 per 10,000 per year

Subarachnoid hemorrhage (SAH) is bleeding into the subarachnoid space—the area between the arachnoid membrane and the pia mater surrounding the brain. Symptoms may include a severe headache of rapid onset, vomiting, decreased level of consciousness, fever, weakness, numbness, and sometimes seizures. Neck stiffness or neck pain are also relatively common. In about a quarter of people a small bleed with resolving symptoms occurs within a month of a larger bleed.

SAH may occur as a result of a head injury or spontaneously, usually from a ruptured cerebral aneurysm. Risk factors for spontaneous cases include high blood pressure, smoking, family history, alcoholism, and cocaine use. Generally, the diagnosis can be determined by a CT scan of the head if done within six hours of symptom onset. Occasionally, a lumbar puncture is also required. After confirmation further tests are usually performed to determine the underlying cause.

Treatment is by prompt neurosurgery or endovascular coiling. Medications such as labetalol may be required to lower the blood pressure until repair can occur. Efforts to treat fevers are also recommended. Nimodipine, a calcium channel blocker, is frequently used to prevent vasospasm. The routine use of medications to prevent further seizures is of unclear benefit. Nearly half of people with a SAH due to an underlying aneurysm die within 30 days and about a third who survive have ongoing problems. Between ten and fifteen percent die before reaching a hospital.

Spontaneous SAH occurs in about one per 10,000 people per year. Females are more commonly affected than males. While it becomes more common with age, about 50% of people present under 55 years old. It is a form of stroke and comprises about 5 percent of all strokes. Surgery for aneurysms was introduced in the 1930s. Since the 1990s many aneurysms are treated by a less invasive procedure called endovascular coiling, which is carried out through a large blood vessel.

A true subarachnoid hemorrhage may be confused with a pseudosubarachnoid hemorrhage, an apparent increased attenuation on CT scans within the basal cisterns that mimics a true subarachnoid hemorrhage. This occurs in cases of severe cerebral edema, such as by cerebral hypoxia. It may also occur due to intrathecally administered contrast material, leakage of high-dose intravenous contrast material into the subarachnoid spaces, or in patients with cerebral venous sinus thrombosis, severe meningitis, leptomeningeal carcinomatosis, intracranial hypotension, cerebellar infarctions, or bilateral subdural hematomas.

== Signs and symptoms ==
The classic symptom of subarachnoid hemorrhage is thunderclap headache (a headache described as "like being kicked in the head", or the "worst ever", developing over seconds to minutes). This headache often pulsates towards the occiput (the back of the head). About one-third of people have no symptoms apart from the characteristic headache, and about one in ten people who seek medical care with this symptom are later diagnosed with a subarachnoid hemorrhage. Vomiting may be present, and 1 in 14 have seizures. Confusion, decreased level of consciousness or coma may be present, as may neck stiffness and other signs of meningism.

Neck stiffness usually presents six hours after initial onset of SAH. Isolated dilation of a pupil and loss of the pupillary light reflex may reflect brain herniation as a result of rising intracranial pressure (pressure inside the skull). Intraocular hemorrhage (bleeding into the eyeball) may occur in response to the raised pressure: subhyaloid hemorrhage (bleeding under the hyaloid membrane, which envelops the vitreous body of the eye) and vitreous hemorrhage may be visible on fundoscopy. This is known as Terson syndrome (occurring in 3–13 percent of cases) and is more common in more severe SAH.

Oculomotor nerve abnormalities (affected eye looking downward and outward and inability to lift the eyelid on the same side) or palsy (loss of movement) may indicate bleeding from the posterior communicating artery. Seizures are more common if the hemorrhage is from an aneurysm; it is otherwise difficult to predict the site and origin of the hemorrhage from the symptoms. SAH in a person known to have seizures is often diagnostic of a cerebral arteriovenous malformation.

The combination of intracerebral hemorrhage and raised intracranial pressure (if present) leads to a "sympathetic surge", i.e. over-activation of the sympathetic system. This is thought to occur through two mechanisms, a direct effect on the medulla that leads to activation of the descending sympathetic nervous system and a local release of inflammatory mediators that circulate to the peripheral circulation where they activate the sympathetic system. As a consequence of the sympathetic surge there is a sudden increase in blood pressure; mediated by increased contractility of the ventricle and increased vasoconstriction leading to increased systemic vascular resistance. The consequences of this sympathetic surge can be sudden, severe, and are frequently life-threatening. The high plasma concentrations of adrenaline also may cause cardiac arrhythmias (irregularities in the heart rate and rhythm), electrocardiographic changes (in 27 percent of cases) and cardiac arrest (in 3 percent of cases) may occur rapidly after the onset of hemorrhage. A further consequence of this process is neurogenic pulmonary edema, where a process of increased pressure within the pulmonary circulation causes leaking of fluid from the pulmonary capillaries into the air spaces, the alveoli, of the lung.

Subarachnoid hemorrhage may also occur in people who have had a head injury. Symptoms may include headache, decreased level of consciousness and hemiparesis (weakness of one side of the body). SAH is a frequent occurrence in traumatic brain injury and carries a poor prognosis if it is associated with deterioration in the level of consciousness.

While thunderclap headache is the characteristic symptom of subarachnoid hemorrhage, less than 10% of those with concerning symptoms have SAH on investigations. A number of other causes may need to be considered.

== Causes ==
Circle of Willis with the most common locations of ruptured aneurysms marked

Most cases of SAH are due to trauma such as a blow to the head. Traumatic SAH usually occurs near the site of a skull fracture or intracerebral contusion. It often happens in the setting of other forms of traumatic brain injury. In these cases prognosis is poorer; however, it is unclear if this is a direct result of the SAH or whether the presence of subarachnoid blood is simply an indicator of a more severe head injury.

In 85 percent of spontaneous cases the cause is a cerebral aneurysm—a weakness in the wall of one of the arteries in the brain that becomes enlarged. They tend to be located in the circle of Willis and its branches. While most cases are due to bleeding from small aneurysms, larger aneurysms (which are less common) are more likely to rupture. Aspirin also appears to increase the risk.

In 15–20 percent of cases of spontaneous SAH, no aneurysm is detected on the first angiogram. About half of these are attributed to non-aneurysmal perimesencephalic hemorrhage, in which the blood is limited to the subarachnoid spaces around the midbrain (i.e. mesencephalon). In these, the origin of the blood is uncertain. The remainder are due to other disorders affecting the blood vessels (such as cerebral arteriovenous malformations), disorders of the blood vessels in the spinal cord, and bleeding into various tumors.

Cocaine abuse and sickle cell anemia (usually in children) and, rarely, anticoagulant therapy, problems with blood clotting and pituitary apoplexy can also result in SAH. Dissection of the vertebral artery, usually caused by trauma, can lead to subarachnoid hemorrhage if the dissection involves the part of the vessel inside the skull.

== Pathophysiology ==
Cerebral vasospasm is one of the complications caused by subarachnoid hemorrhage. It usually happens from the third day after the aneurysm event, and reaches its peak on 5th to 7th day. There are several mechanisms proposed for this complication. Blood products released from subarachnoid hemorrhage stimulates the tyrosine kinase pathway causing the release of calcium ions from intracellular storage, resulting in smooth muscle contraction of cerebral arteries. Oxyhaemoglobin in cerebrospinal fluid (CSF) causes vasoconstriction by increasing free radicals, endothelin-1, prostaglandin and reducing the level of nitric oxide and prostacyclin. Besides, the disturbances of autonomic nervous system innervating cerebral arteries is also thought to cause vasospasm.

== Diagnosis ==
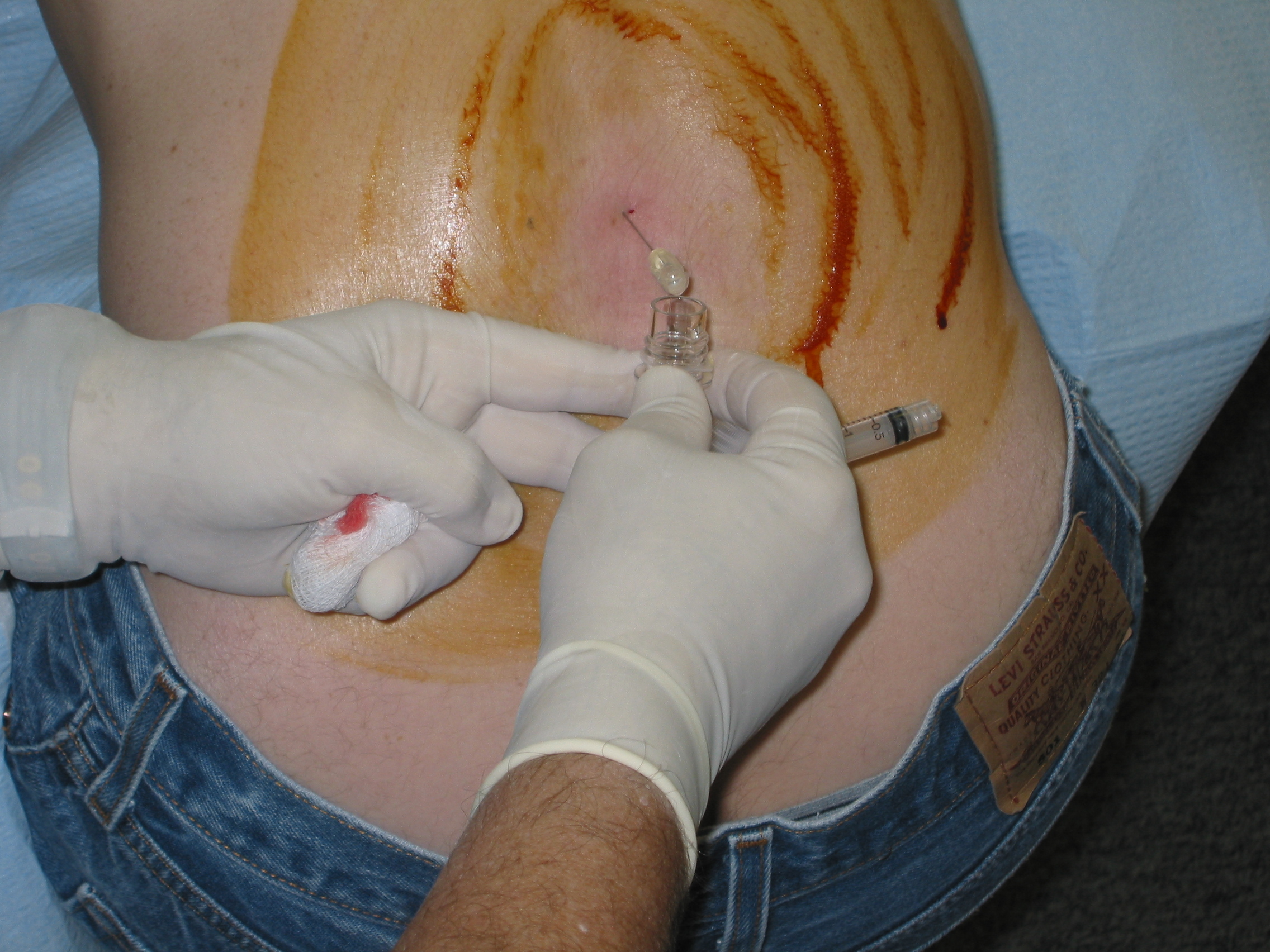
A lumbar puncture in progress. A large area on the back has been washed with an iodine-based disinfectant, leaving brown coloration.

As only 10 percent of people admitted to the emergency department with a thunderclap headache are having an SAH, other possible causes are usually considered simultaneously, such as meningitis, migraine, and cerebral venous sinus thrombosis. Intracerebral hemorrhage, in which bleeding occurs within the brain itself, is twice as common as SAH and is often misdiagnosed as the latter. It is not unusual for SAH to be initially misdiagnosed as a migraine or tension headache, which can lead to a delay in obtaining a CT scan. In a 2004 study, this occurred in 12 percent of all cases and was more likely in people who had smaller hemorrhages and no impairment in their mental status. The delay in diagnosis led to a worse outcome. In some people, the headache resolves by itself, and no other symptoms are present. This type of headache is referred to as "sentinel headache", because it is presumed to result from a small leak (a "warning leak") from an aneurysm. A sentinel headache still warrants investigations with CT scan and lumbar puncture, as further bleeding may occur in the subsequent three weeks.

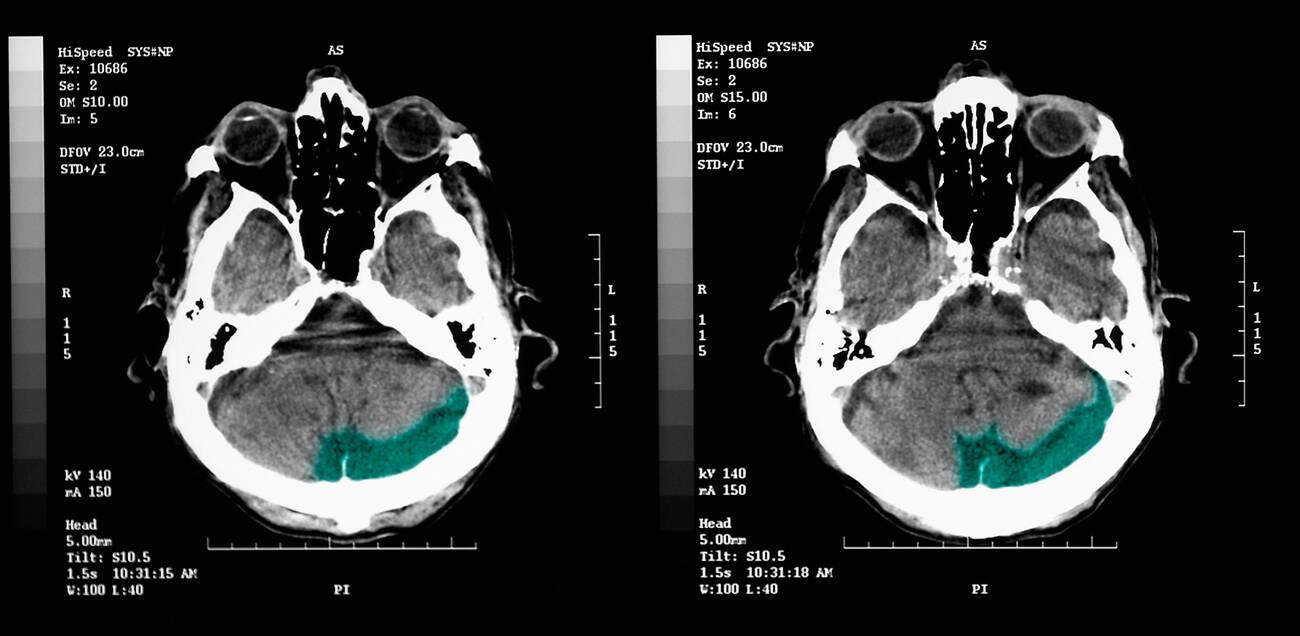
An axial non-contrast CT (NCCT) brain profile on an integrated radiology workstation, used in tandem with lumbar puncture for confirming or excluding suspected subarachnoid bleeding.

The initial steps for evaluating a person with a suspected subarachnoid hemorrhage are obtaining a medical history and performing a physical examination. The diagnosis cannot be made on clinical grounds alone and in general medical imaging and possibly a lumbar puncture is required to confirm or exclude bleeding.

=== Imaging ===
The modality of choice is computed tomography (CT scan), without contrast, of the brain. This has a high sensitivity and will correctly identify 98.7% of cases within six hours of the onset of symptoms. A CT scan can rule out the diagnosis in someone with a normal neurological exam if done within six hours. Its efficacy declines thereafter, and magnetic resonance imaging (MRI) is more sensitive than CT after several days.

==== Angiography ====
After a subarachnoid hemorrhage is confirmed, its origin needs to be determined. If the bleeding is likely to have originated from an aneurysm (as determined by the CT scan appearance), the choice is between cerebral angiography (injecting radiocontrast through a catheter to the brain arteries) and CT angiography (visualizing blood vessels with radiocontrast on a CT scan) to identify aneurysms. Catheter angiography also offers the possibility of coiling an aneurysm (see below).

In emergency department patients complaining of acute-onset headache without significant risk factors for SAH, evidence suggests that CT scanning of the head followed by CT angiography can reliably exclude SAH without the need for a lumbar puncture. The risk of missing an aneurysmal bleed as the cause of SAH with this approach is less than 1%.

=== Lumbar puncture ===
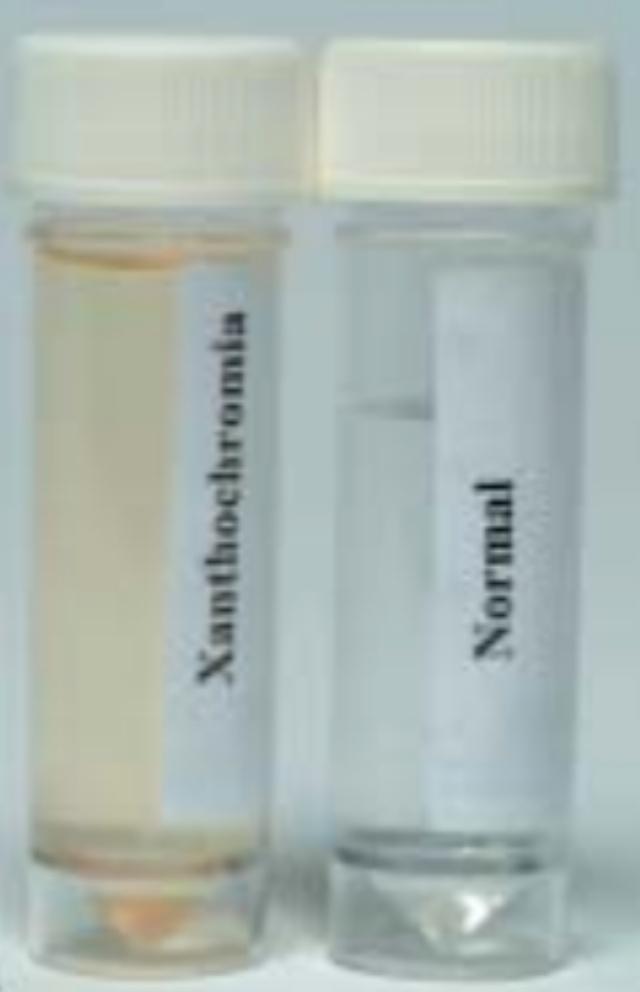
Xanthochromia versus normal CSF

Lumbar puncture, in which cerebrospinal fluid (CSF) is removed from the subarachnoid space of the spinal canal using a hypodermic needle, shows evidence of bleeding in three percent of people in whom a non-contrast CT was found normal. A lumbar puncture or CT scan with contrast is therefore regarded as mandatory in people with suspected SAH when imaging is delayed to after six hours from the onset of symptoms and is negative. At least three tubes of CSF are collected. If an elevated number of red blood cells is present equally in all bottles, this indicates a subarachnoid hemorrhage. If the number of cells decreases per bottle, it is more likely that it is due to damage to a small blood vessel during the procedure (known as a "traumatic tap"). While there is no official cutoff for red blood cells in the CSF no documented cases have occurred at less than "a few hundred cells" per high-powered field.

The CSF sample is also examined for xanthochromia—the yellow appearance of centrifugated fluid. This can be determined by spectrophotometry (measuring the absorption of particular wavelengths of light) or visual examination. It is unclear which method is superior. Xanthochromia remains a reliable ways to detect SAH several days after the onset of headache. An interval of at least 12 hours between the onset of the headache and lumbar puncture is required, as it takes several hours for the hemoglobin from the red blood cells to be metabolized into bilirubin.

=== ECG ===
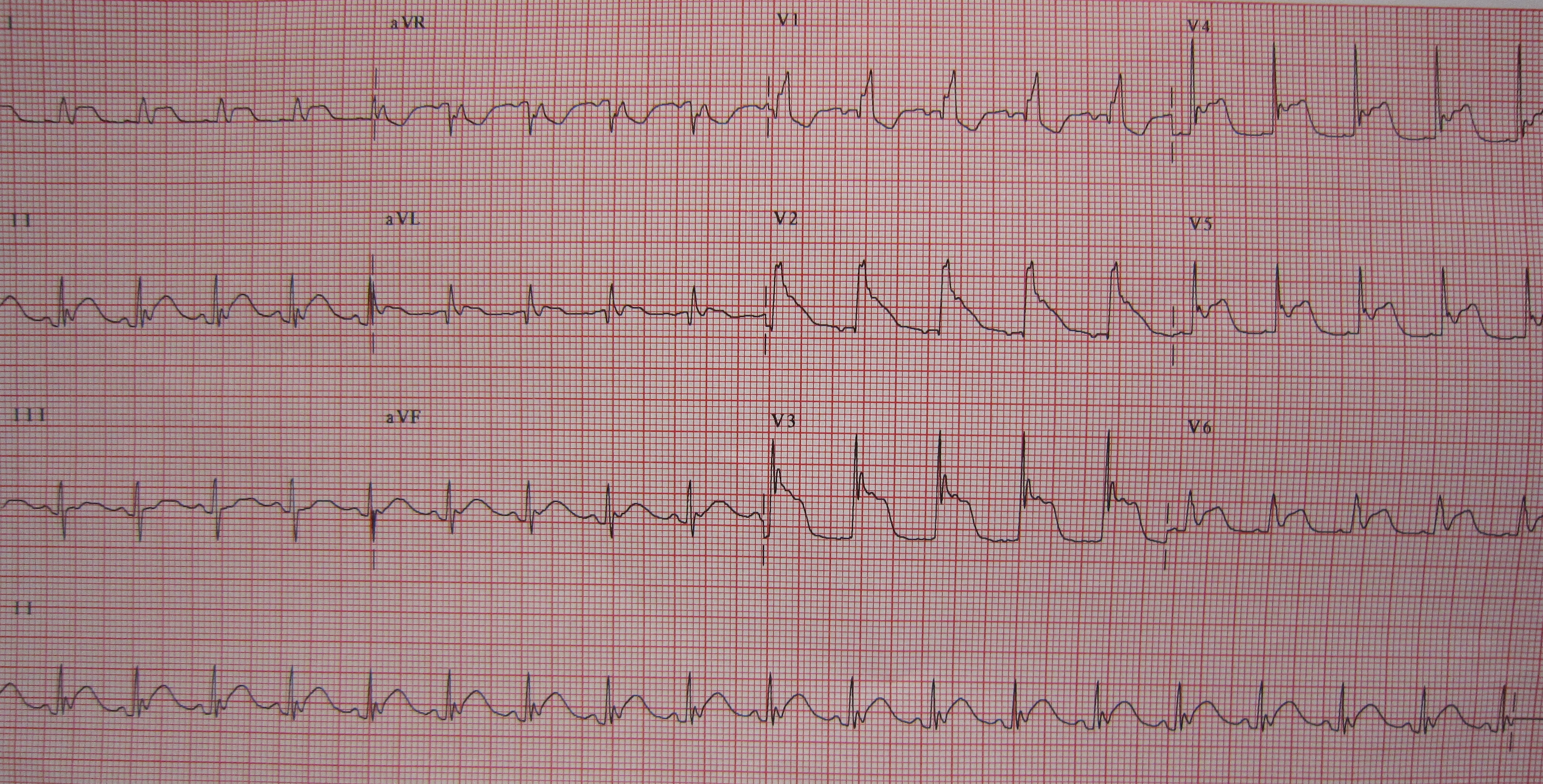
ECG changes resembling those of an STEMI in a woman who had an acute CNS injury from a subarachnoid hemorrhage

Electrocardiographic changes are relatively common in subarachnoid hemorrhage, occurring in 40–70 percent of cases. They may include QT prolongation, Q waves, cardiac dysrhythmias, and ST elevation that mimics a heart attack.

Also one of the characteristic ECG changes that could be found in patients with subarachnoid hemorrhage, is the J waves or Osborn waves, which are positive deflections that occur at the junction between QRS complexes and ST segments, where the S point, also known as the J point, has a myocardial infarction-like elevation. J waves or Osborn waves, which represent an early repolarization and delayed depolarization of the heart ventricles, are thought to be caused by the high catecholamines surge released in patients with subarachnoid hemorrhage or brain damage, the issue that might lead to ventricular fibrillation and cardiac arrest in unmanaged patients.

=== Classification ===
There are several grading scales available for SAH. The Glasgow Coma Scale (GCS) is ubiquitously used for assessing consciousness. Its three specialized scores are used to evaluate SAH; in each, a higher number is associated with a worse outcome. These scales have been derived by retrospectively matching characteristics of people with their outcomes.

The first widely used scale for neurological condition following SAH was published by Botterell and Cannell in 1956 and referred to as the Botterell Grading Scale. This was modified by Hunt and Hess in 1968:

Grade	Signs and symptoms	Survival
1	Asymptomatic or minimal headache and slight neck stiffness	70%
2	Moderate to severe headache; neck stiffness; no neurologic deficit except cranial nerve palsy	60%
3	Drowsy; minimal neurologic deficit	50%
4	Stuporous; moderate to severe hemiparesis; possibly early decerebrate rigidity and vegetative disturbances	20%
5	Deep coma; decerebrate rigidity; moribund	10%

The Fisher Grade classifies the appearance of subarachnoid hemorrhage on CT scan.

Grade	Appearance of hemorrhage
1	None evident
2	Less than 1 mm thick
3	More than 1 mm thick
4	Diffuse or none with intraventricular hemorrhage or parenchymal extension

This scale has been modified by Claassen and coworkers, reflecting the additive risk from SAH size and accompanying intraventricular hemorrhage (0 – none; 1 – minimal SAH w/o IVH; 2 – minimal SAH with IVH; 3 – thick SAH w/o IVH; 4 – thick SAH with IVH);.

The World Federation of Neurosurgeons (WFNS) classification uses Glasgow coma score and focal neurological deficit to gauge severity of symptoms.

Grade	GCS	Focal neurological deficit
1	15	Absent
2	13–14	Absent
3	13–14	Present
4	7–12	Present or absent
5	<7	Present or absent

A comprehensive classification scheme has been suggested by Ogilvy and Carter to predict outcome and gauge therapy. The system consists of five grades and it assigns one point for the presence or absence of each of five factors: age greater than 50; Hunt and Hess grade 4 or 5; Fisher scale 3 or 4; aneurysm size greater than 10 mm; and posterior circulation aneurysm 25 mm or more.

== Screening and prevention ==
Screening for aneurysms is not performed on a population level; because they are relatively rare, it would not be cost-effective. However, if someone has two or more first-degree relatives who have had an aneurysmal subarachnoid hemorrhage, screening may be worthwhile.

Autosomal dominant polycystic kidney disease (ADPKD), a hereditary kidney condition, is known to be associated with cerebral aneurysms in 8 percent of cases, but most such aneurysms are small and therefore unlikely to rupture. As a result, screening is only recommended in families with ADPKD where one family member has had a ruptured aneurysm.

An aneurysm may be detected incidentally on brain imaging; this presents a conundrum, as all treatments for cerebral aneurysms are associated with potential complications. The International Study of Unruptured Intracranial Aneurysms (ISUIA) provided prognostic data both in people having previously had a subarachnoid hemorrhage and people who had aneurysms detected by other means. Those having previously had a SAH were more likely to bleed from other aneurysms. In contrast, those having never bled and had small aneurysms (smaller than 10 mm) were very unlikely to have a SAH and were likely to sustain harm from attempts to repair these aneurysms. On the basis of the ISUIA and other studies, it is now recommended that people are considered for preventive treatment only if they have a reasonable life expectancy and have aneurysms that are highly likely to rupture. Moreover, there is only limited evidence that endovascular treatment of unruptured aneurysms is actually beneficial.

== Treatment ==
Management involves general measures to stabilize the person while also using specific investigations and treatments. These include the prevention of rebleeding by obliterating the bleeding source, prevention of a phenomenon known as vasospasm, and prevention and treatment of complications.

Stabilizing the person is the first priority. Those with a depressed level of consciousness may need to be intubated and mechanically ventilated. Blood pressure, pulse, respiratory rate, and Glasgow Coma Scale are monitored frequently. Once the diagnosis is confirmed, admission to an intensive care unit may be preferable, especially since 15 percent may have further bleeding soon after admission. Nutrition is an early priority, mouth or nasogastric tube feeding being preferable over parenteral routes. In general, pain control is restricted to less-sedating agents such as codeine, as sedation may impact on the mental status and thus interfere with the ability to monitor the level of consciousness. Deep vein thrombosis is prevented with compression stockings, intermittent pneumatic compression of the calves, or both. A bladder catheter is usually inserted to monitor fluid balance. Benzodiazepines may be administered to help relieve distress. Antiemetic drugs should be given to awake persons.

People with poor clinical grade on admission, acute neurologic deterioration, or progressive enlargement of ventricles on CT scan are, in general, indications for the placement of an external ventricular drain by a neurosurgeon. The external ventricular drain may be inserted at the bedside or in the operating room. In either case, strict aseptic technique must be maintained during insertion. In people with aneurysmal subarachnoid hemorrhage the EVD is used to remove cerebrospinal fluid, blood, and blood byproducts that increase intracranial pressure and may increase the risk for cerebral vasospasm.

=== Preventing rebleeding ===
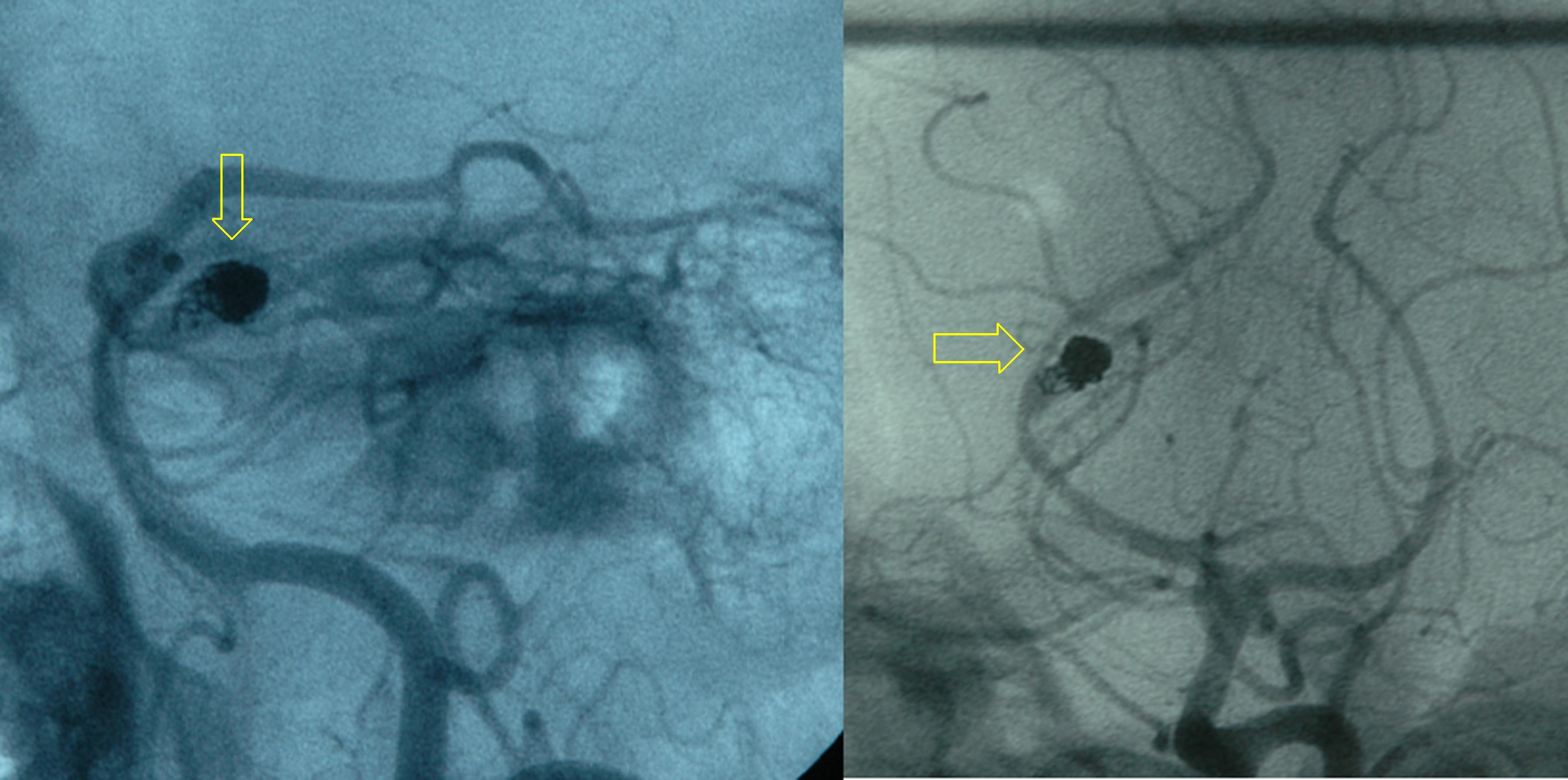
Arteriogram showing a partially coiled aneurysm (indicated by yellow arrows) of the posterior cerebral artery with a residual aneurysmal sac. The person was a 34-year-old woman initially treated for a subarachnoid hemorrhage.

Efforts to keep a person's systolic blood pressure somewhere between 140 and 160 mmHg are generally recommended. Medications to achieve this may include labetalol or nicardipine.

People whose CT scan shows a large hematoma, depressed level of consciousness, or focal neurologic signs may benefit from urgent surgical removal of the blood or occlusion of the bleeding site. The remainder are stabilized more extensively and undergo a transfemoral angiogram or CT angiogram later. It is hard to predict who will have a rebleed, yet it may happen at any time and carries a dismal prognosis. After the first 24 hours have passed, rebleeding risk remains around 40 percent over the subsequent four weeks, suggesting that interventions should be aimed at reducing this risk as soon as possible. Some predictors of early rebleeding are high systolic blood pressure, the presence of a hematoma in the brain or ventricles, poor Hunt-Hess grade (III-IV), aneurysms in the posterior circulation, and an aneurysm >10 mm in size.

If a cerebral aneurysm is identified on angiography, two measures are available to reduce the risk of further bleeding from the same aneurysm: clipping and coiling. Clipping requires a craniotomy (opening of the skull) to locate the aneurysm, followed by the placement of clips around the neck of the aneurysm. Coiling is performed through the large blood vessels (endovascularly): a catheter is inserted into the femoral artery in the groin and advanced through the aorta to the arteries (both carotid arteries and both vertebral arteries) that supply the brain. When the aneurysm has been located, platinum coils are deployed that cause a blood clot to form in the aneurysm, obliterating it. The decision as to which treatment is undertaken is typically made by a multidisciplinary team consisting of a neurosurgeon, neuroradiologist, and often other health professionals.

In general, the decision between clipping and coiling is made on the basis of the location of the aneurysm, its size and the condition of the person. Aneurysms of the middle cerebral artery and its related vessels are hard to reach with angiography and tend to be amenable to clipping. Those of the basilar artery and posterior cerebral artery are hard to reach surgically and are more accessible for endovascular management. These approaches are based on general experience, and the only randomized controlled trial directly comparing the different modalities was performed in relatively well people with small (less than 10 mm) aneurysms of the anterior cerebral artery and anterior communicating artery (together the "anterior circulation"), who constitute about 20 percent of all people with aneurysmal SAH. This trial, the International Subarachnoid Aneurysm Trial (ISAT), showed that in this group the likelihood of death or being dependent on others for activities of daily living was reduced (7.4 percent absolute risk reduction, 23.5 percent relative risk reduction) if endovascular coiling was used as opposed to surgery. The main drawback of coiling is the possibility that the aneurysm will recur; this risk is extremely small in the surgical approach. In ISAT, 8.3 percent needed further treatment in the longer term. Hence, people who have undergone coiling are typically followed up for many years afterwards with angiography or other measures to ensure recurrence of aneurysms is identified early. Other trials have also found a higher rate of recurrence necessitating further treatments.

=== Vasospasm ===
Vasospasm, in which the blood vessels constrict and thus restrict blood flow, is a serious complication of SAH. It can cause ischemic brain injury (referred to as "delayed ischemia") and permanent brain damage due to lack of oxygen in parts of the brain. It can be fatal if severe. Delayed ischemia is characterized by new neurological symptoms, and can be confirmed by transcranial doppler or cerebral angiography. About one third of people admitted with subarachnoid hemorrhage will have delayed ischemia, and half of those have permanent damage as a result. It is possible to screen for the development of vasospasm with transcranial Doppler every 24–48 hours. A blood flow velocity of more than 120 centimeters per second is suggestive of vasospasm.

The pathogenesis of cerebral vasospasm following subarachnoid hemorrhage is attributed to the higher levels of endothelin 1, a potent vasoconstrictor, and the lower levels of endothelial NOS (eNOS), a potent vasodilator. Both of which are produced from a series of events that begin from the inflammatory reaction caused by the products released from erythrocytes' degradation. Following subarachnoid hemorrhage, different clotting factors and blood products are released into the surrounding perivascular spaces known as (Virchow-Robin spaces). The released clotting factors like; fibrinopeptides, thromboxane A2 and others lead to microthrombosis around near vessels that leads to extrinsic vasoconstriction of these vessels. Besides that extrinsic vasoconstriction, the erythrocytes' degradation products like; bilirubin and oxyhemoglobin lead to neuroinflammation that in turn increases the production of reactive oxygen species (ROS) which increases and decreases the production of endothelin 1 and endothelial NOS, respectively, the issue that yields in intrinsic vasoconstriction of the neighboring blood vessels and results in cerebral ischemia if left untreated.

The use of calcium channel blockers, thought to be able to prevent the spasm of blood vessels by preventing calcium from entering smooth muscle cells, has been proposed for prevention. The calcium channel blocker nimodipine when taken by mouth improves outcome if given between the fourth and twenty-first day after the bleeding, even if it does not reduce the amount of vasospasm detected on angiography. It is the only Food and Drug Administration (FDA)-approved drug for treating cerebral vasospasm. In traumatic subarachnoid hemorrhage, nimodipine does not affect long-term outcome, and is not recommended. Other calcium channel blockers and magnesium sulfate have been studied, but are not presently recommended; neither is there any evidence that shows benefit if nimodipine is given intravenously.

Nimodipine is readily authorized in the form of tablets and solution for infusion for the prevention and treatment of complications due to vasospasm following subarachnoid hemorrhage. Another sustained formulation of nimodipine administered via an external ventricular drain (EVD), called EG-1962, is also available. In contrast to the tablets and solution formulations of Nimodipine which require an administration every 4hrs for a total of 21 days, the sustained formulation, EG-1962, needs to be administered once directly into the ventricles. The CSF concentrations from EG-1962, however, were at least 2 orders of magnitude higher than those with oral nimodipine. These results supported a phase 3 study that demonstrated a favorable safety profile for EG-1962 but yielded inconclusive efficacy results due to notable differences in clinical outcome based on baseline disease severity.

Some older studies have suggested that statin therapy might reduce vasospasm, but a subsequent meta-analysis including further trials did not demonstrate benefit on either vasospasm or outcomes. While corticosteroids with mineralocorticoid activity may help prevent vasospasm their use does not appear to change outcomes.

A protocol referred to as "triple H" is often used as a measure to treat vasospasm when it causes symptoms; this is the use of intravenous fluids to achieve a state of hypertension (high blood pressure), hypervolemia (excess fluid in the circulation), and hemodilution (mild dilution of the blood). Evidence for this approach is inconclusive; no randomized controlled trials have been undertaken to demonstrate its effect.

If the symptoms of delayed ischemia do not improve with medical treatment, angiography may be attempted to identify the sites of vasospasms and administer vasodilator medication (drugs that relax the blood vessel wall) directly into the artery. Angioplasty (opening the constricted area with a balloon) may also be performed.

=== Other complications ===
Hydrocephalus (obstruction of the flow of cerebrospinal fluid) may complicate SAH in both the short and long term. It is detected on CT scanning, on which there is enlargement of the lateral ventricles. If the level of consciousness is decreased, drainage of the excess fluid is performed by therapeutic lumbar puncture, extraventricular drain (a temporary device inserted into one of the ventricles), or occasionally a permanent shunt. Relief of hydrocephalus can lead to an enormous improvement in a person's condition. Fluctuations in blood pressure and electrolyte imbalance, as well as pneumonia and cardiac decompensation occur in about half the hospitalized persons with SAH and may worsen prognosis. Seizures occur during the hospital stay in about a third of cases.

People have often been treated with preventative antiepileptic medications. This is controversial and not based on good evidence. In some studies, use of these medications was associated with a worse prognosis; although it is unclear whether this might be because the drugs themselves actually cause harm, or because they are used more often in persons with a poorer prognosis. There is a possibility of a gastric hemorrhage due to stress ulcers.

== Prognosis ==
=== Short-term outcomes ===
SAH is often associated with a poor outcome. The death rate (mortality) for SAH is between 40 and 50 percent, but trends for survival are improving. Of those that survive hospitalization, more than a quarter have significant restrictions in their lifestyle, and less than a fifth have no residual symptoms whatsoever. Delay in diagnosis of minor SAH (mistaking the sudden headache for migraine) contributes to poor outcome. Factors found on admission that are associated with poorer outcome include poorer neurological grade; systolic hypertension; a previous diagnosis of heart attack or SAH; liver disease; more blood and larger aneurysm on the initial CT scan; location of an aneurysm in the posterior circulation; and higher age. Factors that carry a worse prognosis during the hospital stay include occurrence of delayed ischemia resulting from vasospasm, development of intracerebral hematoma, or intraventricular hemorrhage (bleeding into the ventricles of the brain) and presence of fever on the eighth day of admission.

So-called "angiogram-negative subarachnoid hemorrhage", SAH that does not show an aneurysm with four-vessel angiography, carries a better prognosis than SAH with aneurysm, but it is still associated with a risk of ischemia, rebleeding, and hydrocephalus. Perimesencephalic SAH (bleeding around the mesencephalon in the brain), however, has a very low rate of rebleeding or delayed ischemia, and the prognosis of this subtype is excellent.

The prognosis of head trauma is thought to be influenced in part by the location and amount of subarachnoid bleeding. It is difficult to isolate the effects of SAH from those of other aspects of traumatic brain injury; it is unknown whether the presence of subarachnoid blood actually worsens the prognosis or whether it is merely a sign that a significant trauma has occurred. People with moderate and severe traumatic brain injury who have SAH when admitted to a hospital have as much as twice the risk of dying as those who do not. They also have a higher risk of severe disability and persistent vegetative state, and traumatic SAH has been correlated with other markers of poor outcome such as post traumatic epilepsy, hydrocephalus, and longer stays in the intensive care unit. More than 90 percent of people with traumatic subarachnoid bleeding and a Glasgow Coma Score over 12 have a good outcome.

There is also modest evidence that genetic factors influence the prognosis in SAH. For example, having two copies of ApoE4 (a variant of the gene encoding apolipoprotein E that also plays a role in Alzheimer's disease) seems to increase risk for delayed ischemia and a worse outcome. The occurrence of hyperglycemia (high blood sugars) after an episode of SAH confers a higher risk of poor outcome.

=== Long-term outcomes ===
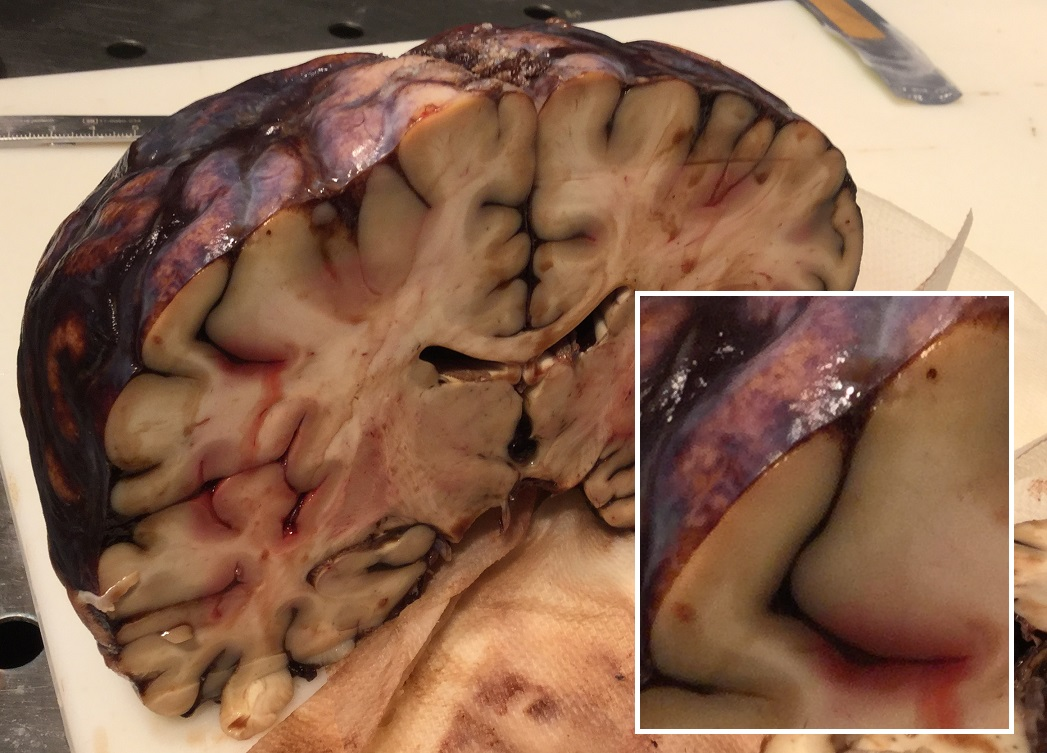
Autopsy of a case with subarachnoid hemorrhage. The arachnoid mater is left in place on the exterior surface, containing extensive hemorrhage that also fills the sulci, as detailed in magnified image.

Neurocognitive symptoms, such as fatigue, mood disturbances, and other related symptoms, are common sequelae. Even in those who have made good neurological recovery, anxiety, depression, posttraumatic stress disorder, and cognitive impairment are common; 46 percent of people who have had a subarachnoid hemorrhage have cognitive impairment that affects their quality of life. Over 60 percent report frequent headaches. Aneurysmal subarachnoid hemorrhage may lead to damage of the hypothalamus and the pituitary gland, two areas of the brain that play a central role in hormonal regulation and production. More than a quarter of people with a previous SAH may develop hypopituitarism (deficiencies in one or more of the hypothalamic–pituitary hormones such as growth hormone, luteinizing hormone, or follicle-stimulating hormone). SAH is also associated with SIADH and cerebral salt wasting, and is the most common cause of the latter.

== Epidemiology ==
Average number of people with SAH per 100,000 person-years, broken down by age

According to a review of 51 studies from 21 countries, the average incidence of subarachnoid hemorrhage is 9.1 per 100,000 annually. Studies from Japan and Finland show higher rates in those countries (22.7 and 19.7, respectively), for reasons that are not entirely understood. South and Central America, in contrast, have a rate of 4.2 per 100,000 on average.

Although the group of people at risk for SAH is younger than the population usually affected by stroke, the risk still increases with age. Young people are much less likely than middle-age people (risk ratio 0.1, or 10 percent) to have a subarachnoid hemorrhage. The risk continues to rise with age and is 60 percent higher in the very elderly (over 85) than in those between 45 and 55. Risk of SAH is about 25 percent higher in women over 55 compared to men the same age, probably reflecting the hormonal changes that result from the menopause, such as a decrease in estrogen levels.

Genetics may play a role in a person's disposition to SAH; risk is increased three- to fivefold in first-degree relatives of people having had a subarachnoid hemorrhage. But lifestyle factors are more important in determining overall risk. These risk factors are smoking, hypertension (high blood pressure), and excessive alcohol consumption. Having smoked in the past confers a doubled risk of SAH compared to those who have never smoked. Some protection of uncertain significance is conferred by caucasian ethnicity, hormone replacement therapy, and diabetes mellitus. There is likely an inverse relationship between total serum cholesterol and the risk of non-traumatic SAH, though confirmation of this association is hindered by a lack of studies. Approximately 4 percent of aneurysmal bleeds occur after sexual intercourse and 10 percent of people with SAH are bending over or lifting heavy objects at the onset of their symptoms.

Overall, about 1 percent of all people have one or more cerebral aneurysms. Most of these are small and unlikely to rupture.

== History ==
While the clinical picture of subarachnoid hemorrhage may have been recognized by Hippocrates, the existence of cerebral aneurysms and the fact that they could rupture was not established until the 18th century. The associated symptoms were described in more detail in 1886 by Edinburgh physician Dr Byrom Bramwell. In 1924, London neurologist Sir Charles P. Symonds (1890–1978) gave a complete account of all major symptoms of subarachnoid hemorrhage, and he coined the term "spontaneous subarachnoid hemorrhage". Symonds also described the use of lumbar puncture and xanthochromia in diagnosis.

The first surgical intervention was performed by Norman Dott, who was a pupil of Harvey Cushing then working in Edinburgh. He introduced the wrapping of aneurysms in the 1930s, and was an early pioneer in the use of angiograms. American neurosurgeon Dr Walter Dandy, working in Baltimore, was the first to introduce clips in 1938. Microsurgery was applied to aneurysm treatment in 1972 in order to further improve outcomes. The 1980s saw the introduction of triple H therapy as a treatment for delayed ischemia due to vasospasm, and trials with nimodipine in an attempt to prevent this complication. In 1983, the Russian neurosurgeon Zubkov and colleagues reported the first use of transluminal balloon angioplasty for vasospasm after aneurysmal SAH. The Italian neurosurgeon Dr Guido Guglielmi introduced his endovascular coil treatment in 1991.
