= Xanthochromia =

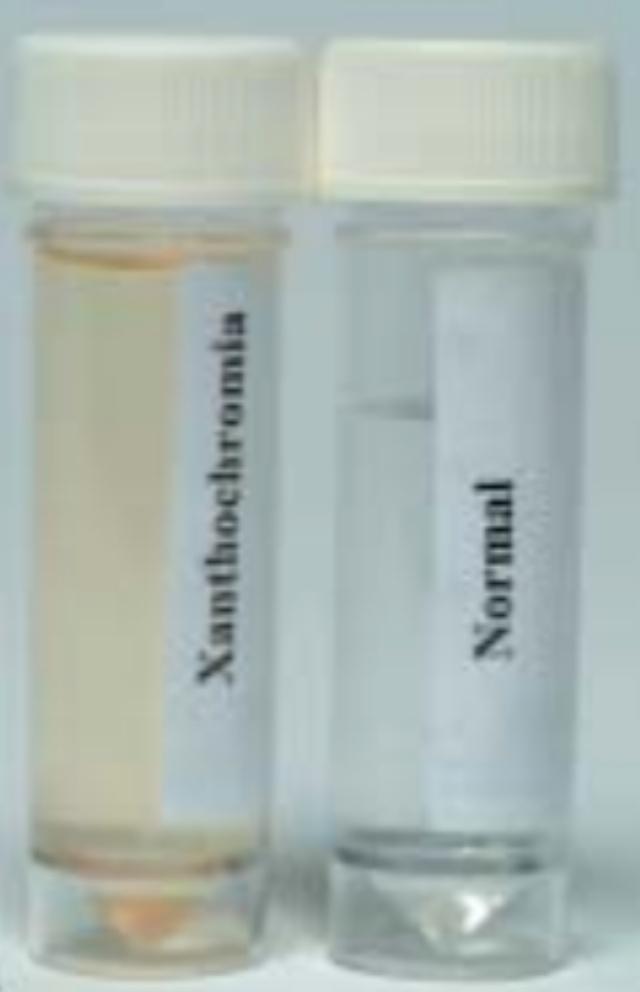

Xanthochromia, from the Greek xanthos (ξανθός) "yellow" and chroma (χρώμα) "colour", is the yellowish appearance of cerebrospinal fluid that occurs several hours after bleeding into the subarachnoid space caused by certain medical conditions, most commonly subarachnoid hemorrhage. Its presence can be determined by either spectrophotometry (measuring the absorption of particular wavelengths of light) or simple visual examination. It is unclear which method is superior.

== Physiology ==
Cerebrospinal fluid, which fills the subarachnoid space between the arachnoid membrane and the pia mater surrounding the brain, is normally clear and colorless. When there has been bleeding into the subarachnoid space, the initial appearance of the cerebrospinal fluid can range from barely tinged with blood to frankly bloody, depending on the extent of bleeding. Within several hours, the red blood cells in the cerebrospinal fluid are destroyed, releasing their oxygen-carrying molecule heme, which is then metabolized by enzymes to bilirubin, a yellow pigment. The most common cause for bleeding into the subarachnoid space is a subarachnoid hemorrhage from a ruptured cerebral aneurysm.

The most frequently employed initial test for subarachnoid hemorrhage is a computed tomography scan of the head, but it detects only 98% of cases in the first 12 hours after the onset of symptoms, and becomes less useful afterwards. Therefore, a lumbar puncture ("spinal tap") is recommended to obtain cerebrospinal fluid if someone has symptoms of a subarachnoid hemorrhage (e.g., a thunderclap headache, vomiting, dizziness, new-onset seizures, confusion, a decreased level of consciousness or coma, neck stiffness or other signs of meningismus, and signs of sudden elevated intracranial pressure), but no blood is visible on the CT scan. According to one article, a spinal tap is not necessary if no blood is seen on a CT scan done using a third generation scanner within six hours of the onset of the symptoms. However, this is not standard of care.

Heme from red blood cells (RBC) that are in the cerebrospinal fluid because a blood vessel was damaged during the lumbar puncture (a "traumatic tap") has no time to be metabolized, and therefore no bilirubin is present.

After the cerebrospinal fluid is obtained, a variety of its parameters can be checked, including the presence of xanthochromia. If the cerebrospinal fluid is bloody, it is centrifuged to determine its color.

== Spectrophotometry ==
Many laboratories rely on only the color of the cerebrospinal fluid to determine the presence or absence of xanthochromia. However, recent guidelines suggest that spectrophotometry should be performed. Spectrophotometry relies on the different transmittance, or conversely, absorbance, of light by different substances or materials, including solutes. Bilirubin absorbs light at wavelengths between 450 and 460 nm. Spectrophotometry can also detect the presence of oxyhemoglobin and methemoglobin, which absorb light at 410-418 nm and 403-410 nm, respectively, and also may indicate that bleeding has occurred; to identify substances in cerebrospinal fluid that absorb light at other wavelengths but are not due to bleeding, such as carotenoids; and to detect very small amounts of yellow color saturation (about 0.62%) which may be missed by visual inspection, especially when the cerebrospinal fluid has been examined under incandescent lighting or a tungsten desk lamp (corresponding to International Commission on Illumination standard illuminant A).

Visual inspection is the most frequent method used in the United States to assess cerebrospinal fluid for xanthochromia, while spectrophotometry is used on up to 94% of specimens in the United Kingdom. There is still disagreement about whether or not to routinely use spectrophotometry or whether visual inspection is adequate, and one group of authors has even advocated measuring bilirubin levels.

== History ==
The concept was introduced in 1902 in a French report on a case of pneumococcal meningitis.

== See also ==
- Xanthochromism
