= Posterior reversible encephalopathy syndrome =

Rare brain condition, leading to severe swelling

- Other names: Reversible posterior leukoencephalopathy syndrome (RPLS)
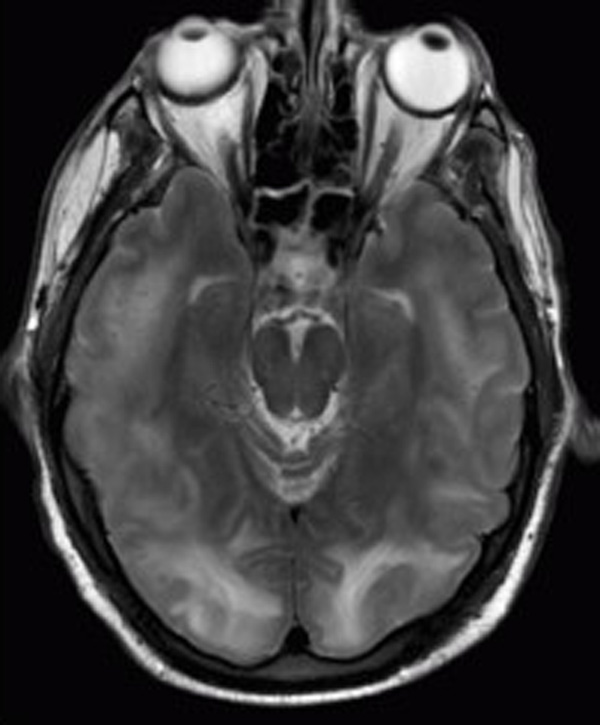
- Posterior reversible encephalopathy syndrome visible on magnetic resonance imaging as multiple cortico-subcortical areas of T2-weighted hyperintense (white) signal involving the occipital and parietal lobes bilaterally and pons.
- Specialty: Neurology
- Symptoms: Seizures, headache, visual disturbances, altered mental state, sometimes limb weakness or inability to speak
- Complications: Intracranial hemorrhage

Posterior reversible encephalopathy syndrome (PRES), also known as reversible posterior leukoencephalopathy syndrome (RPLS), is a rare condition in which parts of the brain are affected by swelling, usually as a result of an underlying cause. Someone with PRES may experience headaches, changes in vision, and seizures, with some developing other neurological symptoms such as confusion or weakness of one or more limbs. The name of the condition includes the word "posterior" because it predominantly, though not exclusively, affects the back of the brain (the parietal and occipital lobes). Common underlying causes are severely elevated blood pressure, kidney failure, severe infections, certain medications, some autoimmune diseases, and pre-eclampsia. The diagnosis is usually made by a brain scan (MRI), in which areas of swelling can be identified.

The treatment for PRES is supportive: removal of the cause or causes and treatment of any of the complications, such as anticonvulsants for seizures. PRES may be complicated by intracranial hemorrhage, but this is relatively rare. The majority of people recover fully, although some may experience some residual symptoms. PRES was first described in 1996.

== Signs and symptoms ==
PRES usually has an acute onset. Most people with PRES experience headaches and seizures; many also experience visual changes, confusion, drowsiness, weakness of the arm and/or leg on one side of the body (hemiplegia), difficulty speaking, or, more rarely, other neurological symptoms. Some people with PRES may experience coma. The visual changes in PRES may include hemianopsia (inability to see the left or right part of the visual field), blurred vision, lack of visual awareness on one side, visual hallucinations, and cortical blindness.

Seizures occur in about two thirds of cases with seizures being the initial symptom in about 50% of cases. In children seizures may be seen in up to 90% of cases of PRES. If seizures occur they may be focal or generalized. About 18% of people who have seizures develop status epilepticus, where seizures are not controllable with simple measures.

== Causes ==
Causes that may contribute to the development of PRES are: immunosuppression (especially for organ transplantation, e.g. with tacrolimus), severe infection and/or sepsis, chemotherapy, autoimmune disease, and pre-eclampsia. High blood pressure is often present. Similarly, the majority of people with PRES have an impaired kidney function, and 21% are receiving regular hemodialysis. In PRES related to medications, there may be an interval of weeks to months between the initiation of the treatment and the development of PRES. After a hematopoietic stem cell transplantation (bone marrow transplant) the risk of PRES is approximately 8%, whereas the risk is lower (0.4-6%) after a solid organ transplant.

The following autoimmune conditions have been found to be associated with PRES: thrombotic thrombocytopenic purpura (TTP), primary sclerosing cholangitis (PSC), rheumatoid arthritis (RA), Sjögren syndrome, polyarteritis nodosa (PAN), systemic sclerosis, systemic lupus erythematosus (SLE), granulomatosis with polyangiitis (GPA), Crohn's disease and neuromyelitis optica (NMO), as well as hemolytic-uremic syndrome (HUS). A number of other associations have also been reported, including some other groups of medications, blood transfusion, elevated calcium levels, decreased magnesium levels, postpartum cerebral angiopathy, and drugs of abuse (cocaine and amphetamine).

It has been suggested that PRES is identical or closely related with hypertensive encephalopathy, the presence of neurological symptoms in those with a hypertensive emergency.

== Mechanism ==
The precise mechanism of PRES is not fully understood, it is considered to be related to a problem with the blood vessels of the brain. There are several theories as to why these blood vessels may become inappropriately permeable and allow the surrounding brain tissue to become swollen. The "vasogenic" theory posits that elevated blood pressure overcomes the normal capability of blood vessels in the brain to maintain a normal cerebral blood flow. The excessive pressure damages the endothelial layer and the blood–brain barrier, leading to swelling (edema). The predilection toward the posterior brain may be explained by the reduced density of sympathetic innervation in the posterior circulation compared to the anterior circulation (thus a reduced adaptive capacity to fluctuations or elevations in blood pressure). The "vasogenic" theory seems to explain the almost 50% of cases of PRES where there had been severely elevated blood pressure. It is also called the "breakthrough" theory, or the "hyperperfusion theory". This theory does not explain the edema in many other cases where the blood pressure has been normal or even low; in fact, the edema tends to be more severe in those without abnormally elevated blood pressure.

In PRES secondary to other causes, the blood vessel damage has been attributed to other mechanisms. The "cytotoxic" theory suggests that it is direct cell damage by toxins (usually medications) that precipitates the edema. The "immunogenic" theory suggests a role for the immune system (specifically T cells). Some consider the cytotoxic and immunogenic theories together as a single "toxic" theory. There appears to be a role of cytokines in causing endothelial dysfunction.

Finally, according to the "neuropeptide/cerebral vasoconstriction" theory, some specific substances (endothelin 1, thromboxane A2) trigger spasm of the blood vessels with resultant vessel wall damage and edema. The latter hypothesis is supported by the frequent finding of diffuse blood vessel spasms (vasoconstriction) in many people with PRES, and the evidence for decreased perfusion, although the spasm may also be a consequence of the blood vessel damage rather than the cause. Some, therefore, include the vasospasm in the "toxic" theory. It is considered likely that these multiple mechanisms all potentially play a role in the development of PRES.

== Diagnosis ==
There are no formal diagnostic criteria for PRES, but it has been proposed that PRES can be diagnosed if someone has developed acute neurological symptoms (seizure, altered mental state, headache, visual disturbances) together with one or more known risk factors, typical appearance on brain imaging (or normal imaging), and no other alternative diagnosis. Some consider that the abnormalities need to be shown to be reversible. If lumbar puncture is performed this may show increased protein levels but no white blood cells. Computed tomography scanning may be performed in the first instance; this may show low density white matter areas in the posterior lobes.

The diagnosis is typically made with magnetic resonance imaging of the brain. The findings most characteristic for PRES are symmetrical hyperintensities on T_{2}-weighed imaging in the parietal and occipital lobes; this pattern is present in more than half of all cases. FLAIR sequences can be better at showing these abnormalities. Some specific other rare patterns have been described: the superior frontal sulcus (SFS) watershed pattern, a watershed pattern involving the entire hemisphere (holohemispheric), and a central pattern with vasogenic oedema in the deep white matter, basal ganglia, thalami, brainstem and pons. These distinct patterns do not generally correlate with the nature of the symptoms or their severity, although severe edema may suggest a poorer prognosis. If the appearances are not typical, other causes for the symptoms and the imaging abnormalities need to considered before PRES can be diagnosed conclusively. In many cases there is evidence of constriction of the blood vessels (if angiography is performed), suggesting a possible overlap with reversible cerebral vasoconstriction syndrome (RCVS). Diffusion MRI may be used to identify areas of cytotoxic edema caused by poor blood flow (ischemia) but it is not clear if this prognostically relevant. Abnormal apparent diffusion coefficient is seen in about 20% of cases.

In 10–25% of cases of PRES there is evidence of hemorrhage on neuroimaging. Various types of hemorrhage may occur: hemorrhage into the brain tissue itself (intraparenchymal hemorrhage), sulcal subarachnoid hemorrhage, and microbleeds.

== Treatment ==
There is no specific treatment for PRES, other than removing or treating any underlying cause. For instance, immunosuppressive medication may need to be withheld. 40% of all people with PRES are unwell enough to require intensive care unit admission for close observation and treatment of complications. Those with PRES with seizures are treated using standard anticonvulsants used in other seizure disorders as there are no specific medications specific to PRES with seizures. However, in those with PRES due to pre-eclampsia or eclampsia, IV magnesium sulfate is the preferred medication for both seizures and hypertension.

There are no universally accepted blood pressure lowering goals in those with PRES and hypertension, however, if there is a hypertensive emergency, the blood pressure may lowered quickly, but not less than 25% within the first hour with the goal of blood pressure normalization within 24 to 48 hours. There are no blood pressure lowering agents that are specifically used in PRES with hypertension, but commonly used agents include the intravenous medications nicardipine, clevidipine or labetalol which are fast acting, quickly adjustable, and can be given using continuous infusion with close monitoring. Of the blood pressure lowering agents available, nitrates may need to be avoided as there is a concern that this may aggravate the PRES even while lowering the blood pressure.

== Prognosis ==
With adequate treatment, 70-90% of people with PRES make a full recovery within hours to days. 8–17% of people with PRES die, although this is not always a direct consequence of the PRES. Of those who have residual symptoms after PRES, this is attributable largely to hemorrhage. Non-resolution of MRI abnormalities has been linked with poorer outcomes. The presence of brain hemorrhage and cytotoxic edema (brain edema with concomittant brain tissue damage) is also associated with a poor prognosis. If PRES was caused by pre-eclampsia or eclampsia the prognosis is better than in PRES due to other causes.

Factors that predict poorer prognosis are the person's age, the level of C-reactive protein in the blood (a marker of inflammation), altered mental state at the time of diagnosis, and altered markers of coagulation. People with diabetes may have a worse outcome, and abnormalities in the corpus callosum on MRI have been linked with worse prognosis. Some patterns on electroencephalography (EEG) are also associated with a poorer outcome.

After an episode of PRES, even when it was associated with seizure activity, only a small proportion of people remain at risk of ongoing seizures and the majority can eventually discontinue anticonvulsant treatment. Approximately 3% of those with PRES will develop late, recurrent seizures with 1% developing a chronic seizure disorder (epilepsy).

== Epidemiology ==
The incidence (number of cases per year) of PRES is not known, but increasing use of MRI scans has led to increased recognition. The incidence of PRES in certain subgroups has been estimated to be approximately 0.8% in those with end stage renal disease, 0.7% in those with SLE, and 0.5% in those with a solid organ transplant. In select single center retrospective cohort studies, the incidence of PRES on neuroimaging in those with eclampsia was between 75 and 98%, with a much smaller incidence of PRES seen in those with pre-eclampsia. Younger age at pregnancy (median age 23 in one study), presence of eclampsia, and primigravida (having a first pregnancy) are all associated with a greater risk of PRES in pregnant people.

== History ==
PRES was first described in 1996 in a group of 15 patients identified retrospectively in the records of the New England Medical Center in Boston and Hôpital Sainte Anne in Paris. The name was revised in 2000 from "leukencephalopathy" to "encephalopathy" as the former suggested that it only affects the white matter of the brain, which is not the case.
