= Cerebellar stroke syndrome =

- The three major arteries of the cerebellum: the SCA, AICA, and PICA
- Specialty: Neurology

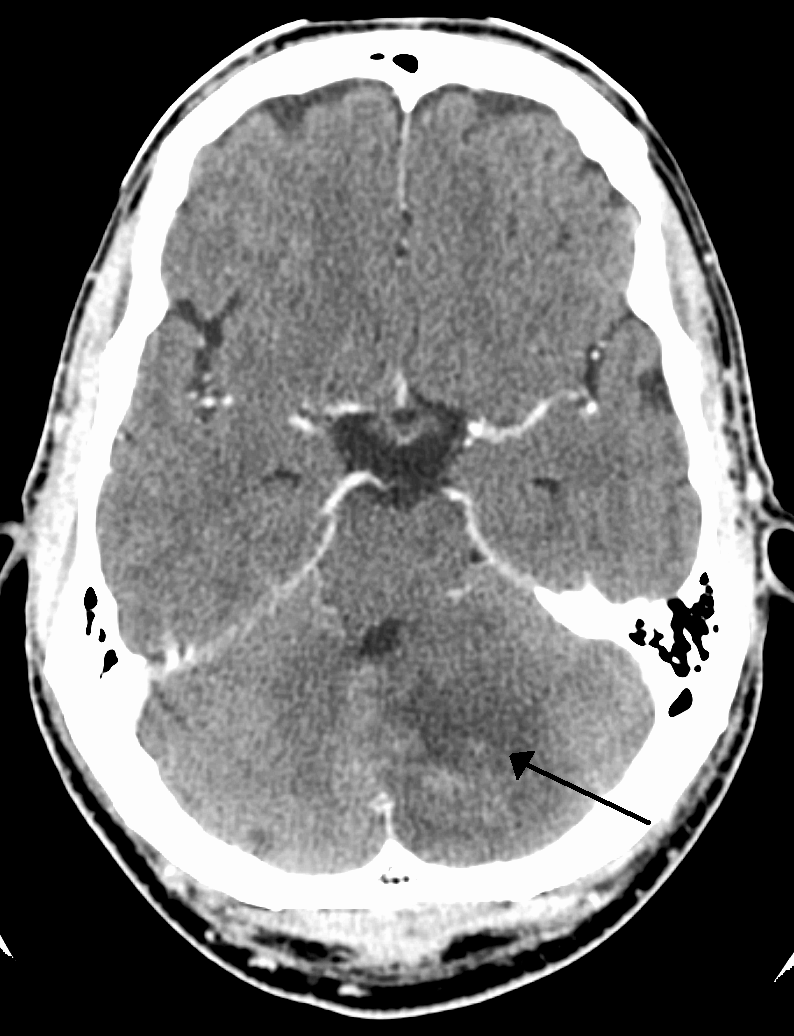
Left sided cerebellar stroke due to occlusion of a vertebral artery

Cerebellar stroke syndrome is a condition in which the circulation to the cerebellum is impaired due to a lesion of the superior cerebellar artery, anterior inferior cerebellar artery or the posterior inferior cerebellar artery.

Cardinal signs include vertigo, headache, vomiting, and ataxia.

Cerebellar strokes account for only 2-3% of the 600,000 strokes that occur each year in the United States. They are far less common than strokes which occur in the cerebral hemispheres. In recent years mortality rates have decreased due to advancements in health care which include earlier diagnosis through MRI and CT scanning. Advancements have also been made which allow earlier management for common complications of cerebellar stroke such as brainstem compression and hydrocephalus.

Research is still needed in the area of cerebellar stroke management; however, several factors may lead to poor outcomes in individuals who have a cerebellar stroke. These factors include:

1. Declining levels of consciousness
2. New signs of brainstem involvement
3. Progressing Hydrocephalus
4. Stroke to the midline of the cerebellum (a.k.a. the vermis)
