= Endovascular coiling =

Surgical treatment for aneurysm

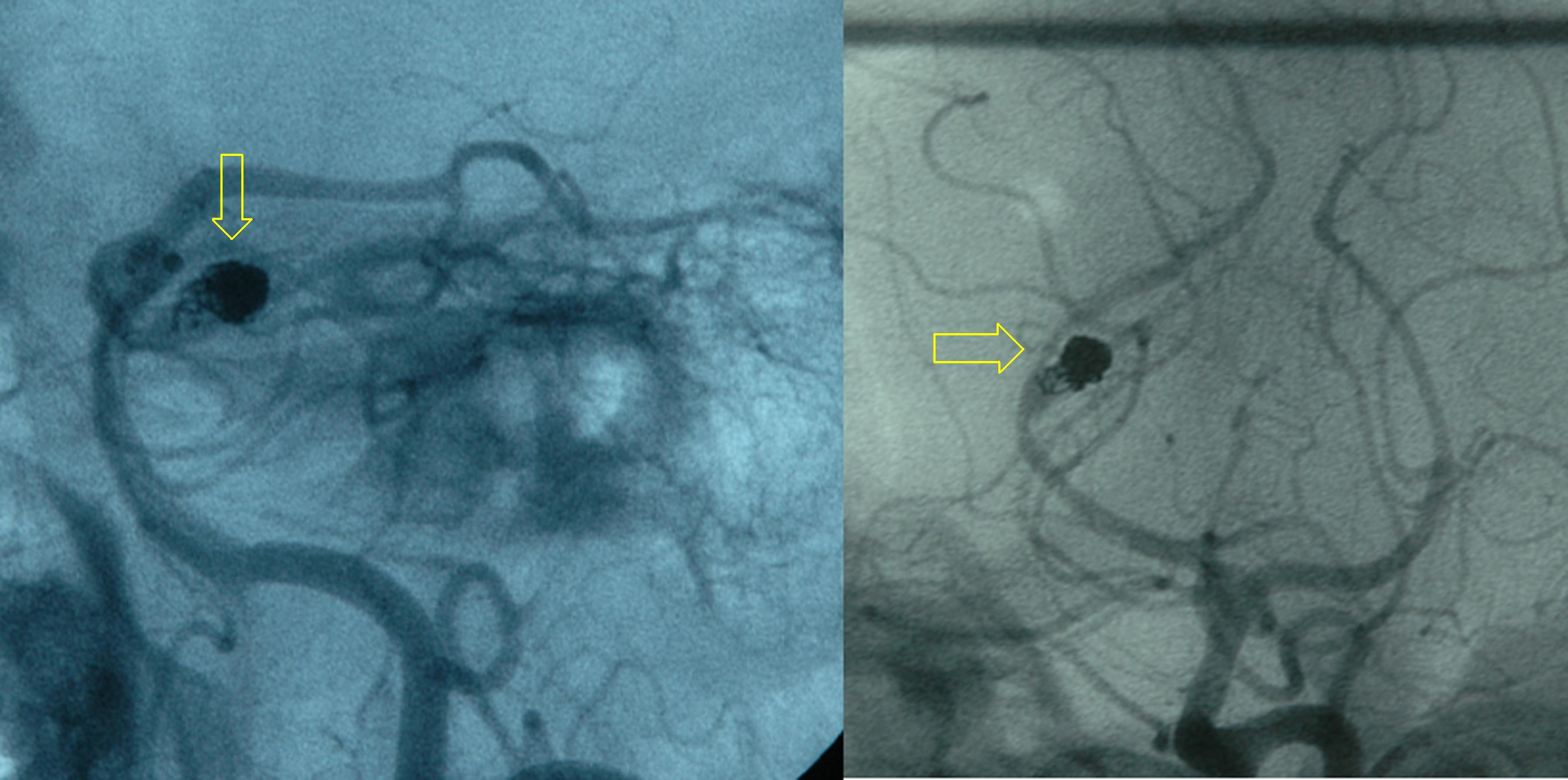
- Post-embolization arteriogram showing coiled aneurysm (indicated by yellow arrows) of the posteriorcerebral artery with a residual aneurysmal sac.
- Other names: Endovascular embolization
- Specialty: Interventional neuroradiology

Endovascular coiling is an endovascular treatment for intracranial aneurysms and bleeding throughout the body. The procedure reduces blood circulation to an aneurysm or blood vessel through the implantation of detachable platinum wires, with the clinician inserting one or more into the blood vessel or aneurysm until it is determined that blood flow is no longer occurring within the space. It is one of two main treatments for cerebral aneurysms, the other being surgical clipping.

== Medical uses ==
Endovascular coiling is typically used to treat cerebral aneurysms. The main goal is prevention of rupture in unruptured aneurysms, and prevention of rebleeding in ruptured aneurysms by limiting blood circulation to the aneurysm space. Clinically, packing density is recommended to be 20-30% or more of the aneurysm's volume, typically requiring deployment of multiple wires. Higher volumes may be difficult due to the delicate nature of the aneurysm; intraoperative rupture rates are as high as 7.6% for this procedure. In ruptured aneurysms, coiling is performed quickly after rupture because of the high risk of rebleeding within the first few weeks after initial rupture. The patients most suitable for endovascular coiling are those with aneurysms with a small neck size (preferably <4 mm), luminal diameter <25 mm, and those that are distinct from the parent vessel. Larger aneurysms are subject to compaction of coils, due to both looser packing densities (more coils are needed) and increased blood flow. Coil compaction renders them unsuitable as they are incapable of stemming blood flow. However, technological advances have made coiling of many other aneurysms possible as well.

=== Results ===
A number of studies have questioned the efficacy of endovascular coiling over the more traditional surgical clipping. Most concerns involve the chance of later bleeds or other recanalization. Due to its less invasive nature, endovascular coiling usually presents faster recovery times than surgical clipping, with one study finding a significant decrease in probability of death or dependency compared to a neurosurgical population. Complication rates for coiling as well are generally found to be lower than microsurgery (11.7% and 17.6% for coiling and microsurgery, respectively). Despite this, intraoperative rupture rates for coiling have been documented as being as high as 7.6%. Clinical results are found to be similar at a two-month and one year follow-up between coiling and neurosurgery.

Reported recurrence rates are quite varied, with rates between 20 and 50% of aneurysms recurring within one year of coiling, and with the recurrence rate increasing with time. These results are similar to those previously reported by other endovascular groups. Other studies have questioned whether new matrix coils work better than bare platinum coils.

The International Subarachnoid Aneurysm Trial tested the efficacy of endovascular coiling against the traditional micro-surgical clipping. The study initially found very favorable results for coiling, however its results and methodology were criticized. Since the study's release in 2002, and again in 2005, some studies have found higher recurrence rates with coiling, while others have concluded that there is no clear consensus between which procedure is preferred.

== Risks ==
Risks of endovascular coiling include stroke, aneurysm rupture during the procedure and aneurysm recurrence and rupture after the procedure. Additionally in some patients coiling may not be successful. In general, coiling is only performed when the risk of aneurysm rupture is higher than the risks of the procedure itself.

Similar to patients who experience neurosurgical procedures, coiling results in an increase in resting energy expenditure, albeit at a slightly reduced rate than their neurosurgery counterpart. This can lead to malnutrition if steps are not taken to compensate for the increased metabolic rate.

== Mechanism ==
The treatment works by promoting blood clotting (thrombosis) in the aneurysm, eventually sealing it from the blood flow. This is accomplished by decreasing the amount of blood flow going into the aneurysm, increasing the residence time of the blood (thereby lowering the velocity) in the aneurysm space and reducing the wall shear stress of the aneurysm wall. This change in the blood flow, or hemodynamics, is ultimately dependent on several factors, including:

- aneurysm type (directly on the parent artery or on a bifurcation of an artery)
- aneurysm position (relative angle of aneurysm to approaching blood flow)
- coil packing density
- angle of parent vessel curvature
- size of aneurysm neck

While these factors are crucial to the success of the procedure, thrombosis ultimately is dependent on biological processes, with the coiling only providing the appropriate conditions for the process to occur, and hopefully closing the aneurysm.

== Procedure ==
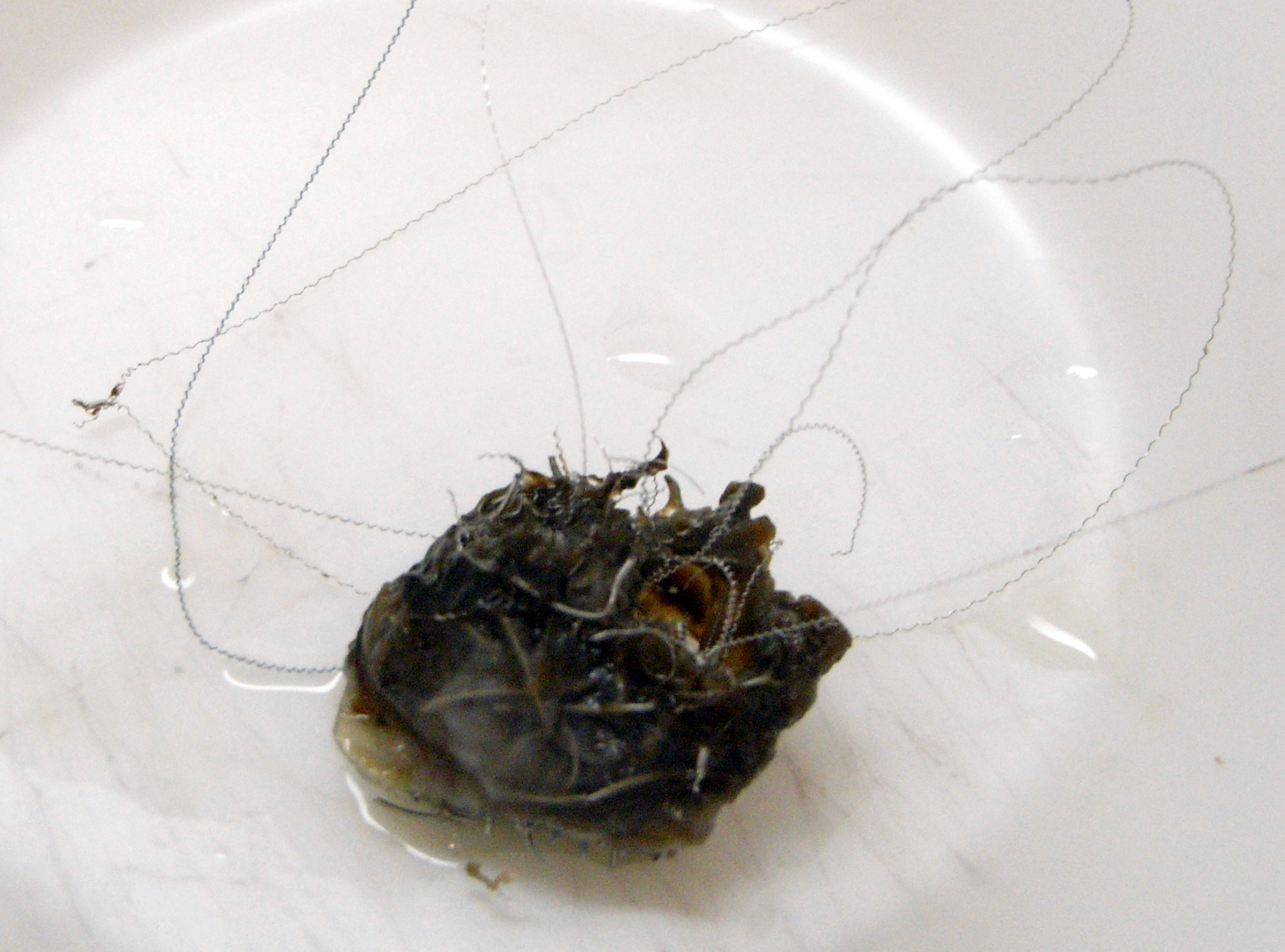
Resected middle cerebral artery aneurysm filled with multiple coils.

Endovascular coiling is usually performed by an interventional neuroradiologist or neurosurgeon with the patient under general anaesthesia. The whole procedure is performed under fluoroscopic imaging guidance. A guiding catheter is inserted through the femoral artery and advanced to a site close to the aneurysm after which angiography is performed to localize and assess the aneurysm. After this, a microcatheter is navigated into the aneurysm.

The treatment uses detachable coils made of platinum that are inserted into the aneurysm using the microcatheter. A variety of coils are available, including Guglielmi Detachable Coils (GDC) which are platinum, Matrix coils which are coated with a biopolymer, and hydrogel coated coils. Coils are also available in a variety of diameters, lengths, and cross sections. A coil is first inserted along the aneurysm wall to create a frame, with the core then being filled with more coils. A series of progressively smaller coils may also be used. Success is determined by injecting a contrast dye into parent artery and qualitatively determining if dye is flowing into the aneurysm space during fluoroscopy. If no flow is observed, the procedure is considered completed. In the case of wide-necked aneurysms a stent may be used.

== History ==
Endovascular coiling was a developed through the synthesis of a number of innovations that took place between 1970 and 1990 in the field of electronics, neurosurgery, and interventional radiology. While the procedure itself has been and continues to be compared to surgical clipping, the development of the concept and procedure has resulted in it becoming the gold standard at many centers.

=== Filling the intravascular compartment ===
The first documented technique of using metal coils to induce thrombosis was accomplished by Mullan in 1974. Copper coils were inserted into a giant aneurysm through externally puncturing the aneurysm wall via craniotomy. Five patients died, with ten having satisfactory process. It did not gain popularity due to the specialized equipment required, in addition to the technique being unsuitable for many types of aneurysms. Later, in 1980, similar techniques were developed by Alksne and Smith using iron suspended in methyl methacrylate in a limited set of patients. There were no deaths in 22 consecutive cases with low morbidity. This technique also did not gain traction due to advances in clipping.

=== Endovascular approaches ===
As a means of avoiding invasive methods, early endovascular interventions involved the usage of detachable and nondetachable balloon catheters to occlude the aneurysm while preserving the parent artery. Despite the innovative approach, the aneurysms were often found to adapt to the shape of the balloon itself resulting in higher incidents of aneurysm rupture. This procedure was deemed "uncontrollable" due to its high morbidity and mortality rate, but it demonstrated that the endovascular approach was feasible for many aneurysms. Endovascular coils would later be used in 1989 by Hilal et al., but these were short, stiff coils that offered no control, preventing dense packing of the aneurysm. Controllable microguidewire systems were later used.

=== Detachable coil system ===
In 1983 the use of electrically induced thrombosis for intracranial aneurysms was described for the first time. A stainless steel electrode supplied a positive current to the aneurysm to stimulate electrothrombosis. Minimal occlusion was achieved, but the researchers discovered that the erosion of the electrode due to electrolysis would be useful as a detachment system. Detachable coils were constructed from a platinum coil soldered to a stainless steel delivery wire, first described in 1991 by Guglielmi et al. When combined with a controllable microguide wire system, multiple coils could be inserted to fully pack an aneurysm.

== Research ==
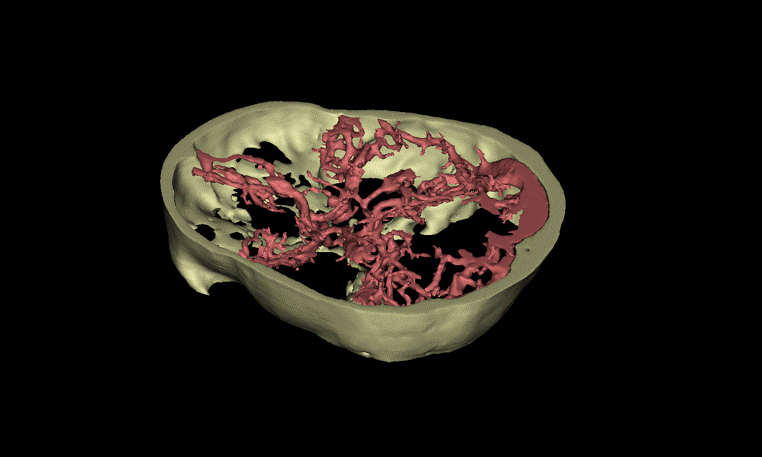
A 3D reconstruction of the Circle of Willis derived from a CT angiogram.

Given the complexity of modeling the vasculature, much research has been devoted towards modeling the hemodynamics of an aneurysm before and after an intervention. Techniques such as particle image velocimetry (PIV) and computational fluid dynamics/finite element analysis (CFD/FEA) have yielded results that have influenced the direction of research, but no model to date has been able to account for all factors present. Advantages of the in-silico research method include flexibility of selecting variables, but one comparative study has found that simulations tend to over-emphasis results compared to PIV, and are more beneficial for trends than exact values.

Medical images, particularly CT angiography, can be used to generate 3D reconstructions of patient specific anatomy. When combined with CFD/FEA, hemodynamics can be estimated in patient specific simulations, giving the clinician greater predictive tools for surgical planning and outcome evaluation to best promote thrombus formation. However, most computer models use many assumptions for simplicity, including rigid walls (non-elastic) for vasculature, substituting a porous medium in place of physical coil representations, and navier-stokes for fluid behavior. However, new predictive models are being developed as computational power increases, including algorithms for simulations of coil behavior in-vivo.
