= Anti-amyloid antibodies =

Drug class

- Drug class

Class identifiers
- Mechanism of action: Block or inhibit β-amyloid
- Biological target: β-Amyloid
- Chemical class: Monoclonal antibodies

Legal status

Anti-amyloid antibodies (AAA) are a class of monoclonal antibodies developed to treat Alzheimer's disease. Anti-amyloid antibodies are shown to have no effect in the treatment of Alzheimer's disease.

== Approved drugs ==
As of 2025, lecanemab and donanemab are the only drugs to have been approved by the European Medicines Agency, with controlled access.

=== Aducanumab ===
Aducanumab, sold under the brand name Aduhelm, is an anti-amyloid drug designed to treat Alzheimer's disease. It is a monoclonal antibody that targets aggregated forms (plaque) of amyloid beta (Aβ) found in the brains of people with Alzheimer's disease to reduce its buildup. It was developed by Biogen and Eisai. Aducanumab is given via intravenous infusion.

Aducanumab was approved for medical use in the United States by the Food and Drug Administration (FDA) in June 2021, in a controversial decision that led to the resignation of three advisers to the FDA in the absence of evidence that the medication is effective. The FDA stated that it represents a first-of-its-kind treatment approved for Alzheimer's disease and that it is the first new treatment approved for Alzheimer's since 2003. Aducanumab's approval is controversial for numerous reasons including ambiguous clinical trial results regarding efficacy, the high cost of the medication and the very high rate of serious adverse events. The FDA considers it to be a first-in-class medication.

In November 2020, a panel of outside experts for the FDA concluded that a pivotal study of aducanumab failed to show strong evidence that the medication worked, citing questionable efficacy and multiple red flags found with the data analysis. There were also significant health risks associated with the medication; brain swelling or brain bleeding was found in 41% of patients enrolled in the studies. Nevertheless, the medication was approved under the FDA's accelerated approval pathway, and the FDA requires Biogen to perform follow-up reviews to assure the medication is a safe and effective treatment for Alzheimer's disease. The Office of Inspector General, US Department of Health and Human Services was asked to investigate interaction between the drug company and the FDA prior to the medication's approval.

Biogen abandoned the drug in January 2024, for financial reasons.

=== Lecanemab ===
Lecanemab, sold under the brand name Leqembi, is a monoclonal antibody medication used for the treatment of mild Alzheimer's disease. Lecanemab is an amyloid beta-directed antibody. It is given via intravenous infusion or subcutaneous injection. In clinical trials, it demonstrated small or no clinically significant efficacy in Alzheimer's disease. The most common side effects of lecanemab include headache, infusion-related reactions, and amyloid-related imaging abnormalities, a side effect known to occur with the class of antibodies targeting amyloid. Lecanemab was jointly developed by Eisai, Biogen, and Bioarctic.

=== Donanemab ===
Donanemab, sold under the brand name Kisunla, is a monoclonal antibody used for the treatment of Alzheimer's disease. Donanemab was developed by Eli Lilly and Company.

It has no clinically significant effect in the treatment of Alzheimer's disease.

The most common side effects include amyloid-related imaging abnormalities, which are brain hemorrhages and brain swelling, which can cause strokes, seizures, falls and trouble thinking. Brain hemorrhage and swelling occurred in 36.8% of people taking donanemab and 14.9% of people taking placebo. Headache and allergic reactions to the medication were other common side effects.

Donanemab was approved for medical use in the United States in July 2024. Most of the members of the US Food and Drug Administration (FDA) advisory panel had financial conflicts of interest. Treatment is intended for people with mild cognitive impairment or mild dementia stage of disease, which is the same population the treatment was studied in the clinical trials. Several public interest groups spoke out in FDA hearings against approval of the drug.

== Efficacy ==
A 2023 review found that "Anti-Aβ drugs have relatively low efficacy in preventing cognitive decline, and they reduce pathological productions with acceptable safety." A 2022 review finds "a statistically significant but slight clinical effect of these drugs emerges in patients with early AD after 18 months" and states, "The risk/benefit ratio of this class of drugs in early AD remains so far questionable after 18 months."

From a 2023 statement by the European Association of Neurology and the European Psychiatric Association, "Anti-Aβ antibodies represent a significant advance in the treatment of AD, but their effectiveness is moderate and much work remains to be done to improve their efficacy, safety and accessibility."

In a 2023 commentary, the authors express concern that the results of the trials, which are based on scoring by patients and their caregivers, of these drugs could be confounded by unblinding produced by adverse effects. They also support running studies designed to distinguish between disease-modifying and symptomatic effects.

A 2024 study suggests that the cognitive benefits of monoclonal antibody treatments for Alzheimer's disease may result from increases in Aβ42 levels, rather than solely from the removal of amyloid plaques. This challenges traditional amyloid-focused hypotheses, highlighting the need for further research into the role of Aβ42 and the risk/benefit balance of these treatments.

A 2026 meta-analysis suggests that anti-amyloid antibodies have no effect in the treatment of Alzheimer's disease.

A 2026 Cochrane review found no effect or at best small effect. An international group of clinicians and researchers has criticized this review on the basis of methodological and analytical limitations, the inclusion of antibodies with differing efficacies, and other reasons.

== Adverse effects ==
=== Amyloid related imaging abnormalities ===
Amyloid-related imaging abnormalities (ARIA) are a serious adverse effect; with higher rates of ARIA associated with higher amyloid clearance. There are two categories of ARIA, based on signal changes believed to be associated with vasogenic edema (ARIA-E) and microhemorrhages (ARIA-H).

=== Accelerated brain volume loss ===
Brain volume loss is a symptom of Alzheimer's disease and is accelerated by anti-amyloid drugs developed to treat it. One meta-analysis found that people with mild cognitive impairment treated with anti-amyloid drugs would reach the brain volume associated with full Alzheimer's disease eight months earlier than those who received no such treatment. The significance of the brain volume loss caused by these drugs is unknown.

The mechanism is not fully understood. Amyloid-related imaging abnormalities (ARIA) have been suggested as a possible cause of the accelerated brain volume loss. Others say it may be attributed to the reduction in amyloid plaques.

Accelerated brain volume loss has been reported with lecanemab, aducanumab, donanemab, and other anti-amyloid drugs. Hippocampal, ventricular, and whole brain volumes are reported in studies and declines in all three have been found. However, the affected parts of the brain are not fully understood.

== Society and culture ==
=== Drug development ===
The first drug in the class to be developed, in the early 2000s, is bapineuzumab, but it did not show effectiveness in later-stage trials. The first drug to be approved by the US Food and Drug Administration (FDA) was aducanumab—in 2021, but the compound was withdrawn from sale three years later due to Biogen focusing efforts on lecanemab.

=== Cost ===
Concerns have been raised about the high cost of the drugs and accessibility to patients.

== See also ==
- Anti-tau drug
- Anti-α-synuclein drug
- UB-311 – β-amyloid vaccine
