= Crenezumab =

Antibody tested against Alzheimer's

Monoclonal antibody
- Type: Whole antibody
- Source: Humanized (from mouse)
- Target: 1-40-β-amyloid

Clinical data
- ATC code: none

Identifiers
- CAS Number: 1095207-05-8
- DrugBank: DB11959
- ChemSpider: none
- UNII: O8AS5277H0
- KEGG: D10101

Chemical and physical data
- Formula: C_{6442}H_{9966}N_{1706}O_{2018}S_{40}
- Molar mass: 144884.91 g·mol^{−1}

Crenezumab is a fully humanized monoclonal antibody against human 1-40 and 1-42 beta amyloid, which is being investigated as a treatment of Alzheimer's disease. Crenezumab is highly homologous to solanezumab, another monoclonal antibody targeting amyloid-β peptides. In June 2022, the US National Institutes of Health announced that the drug failed as a medication for early-onset Alzheimer's disease following the results of a decade-long clinical trial.

== Development ==
Crenezumab was developed by Ruth Greferath, Ph.D., and Claude Nicolau, Ph.D., before the Swiss-based biopharmaceutical company AC Immune was founded, which focuses on developing targeted therapeutics for misfolded proteins that cause neurodegenerative diseases, such as Alzheimer's and Parkinson's disease. AC Immune was founded in 2003 by current CEO Andrea Pfeifer, Ph.D. and funded primarily by German billionaire Dietmar Hopp. In 2016, AC Immune filed for an IPO valuing the company at $700 million and subsequently sold 6.9 million shares for net proceeds of $68.73 million.

To develop crenezumab, AC Immune utilized its SupraAntigen technology, which involves injecting mice with liposomes that contain several hundred peptide mimics of antigens in order to generate a multitude of antibodies, from which the ones with best specificity are selected. It is believed that crenezumab works by causing beta amyloid proteins to transition from an insoluble to a soluble form, inhibiting aggregation and promoting disaggregation of existing plaques.

Crenezumab was licensed to Genentech, Inc. in 2006. Genentech is fully responsible for the clinical development, manufacturing, and commercialization of crenezumab.

== Patent ==
Crenezumab is protected under US Patent US7892544, which was filed 12 June 2007. As of November 2016, there are two other drugs in development which also target beta amyloid, namely solanezumab and aducanumab.

== Clinical trials ==
=== ABBY study ===
ABBY was a phase II study that evaluated the effects of crenezumab in patients with mild-to-moderate Alzheimer's Disease, which concluded in 2014. The primary endpoints were reduction in cognitive decline and global function decline. Patients treated with high-dose intravenous crenezumab showed non-significant reductions in both cognitive decline and global function decline, while patients who received subcutaneous crenezumab did not improve on either measure. Exploratory analysis of patients with the mildest symptoms (as defined by a Mini Mental State Examination score of 22-26) who received high-dose intravenous crenezumab did show a significant reduction in cognitive decline, but not in global function decline.

=== BLAZE study ===
BLAZE was a phase II study that also concluded in 2014 and evaluated the effects of crenezumab in patients with mild-to-moderate Alzheimer's Disease, however its primary endpoint was changes in brain amyloid load, with secondary endpoints of changes in other biomarkers, cognition, global function, and activities of daily living. The resultant data showed no significant difference between either high-dose intravenous or subcutaneous crenezumab and placebo.

=== API ADAD Columbia trial ===
In May 2012, it was announced that the efficacy of crenezumab will be tested in a five-year trial against early-onset Alzheimer's disease. The $100 million trial will be funded by Genentech, the Banner Alzheimer's Institute, and the National Institutes of Health. Participants in the study will be recruited from an extended family in and around Medellín, Colombia. Approximately one-third of the 5,000 family members carry an autosomal dominant allele of presenilin-1 (PSEN1) that causes the early-onset form of Alzheimer's disease. The trial will test the effect of the drug on 300 individuals who have the PSEN1 mutation, but do not yet show symptoms of the disease.

In June, the NIH announced the preliminary results stating that crenezumab failed to give "clinical benefit in cognitively healthy people who have a rare genetic mutation that causes early-onset Autosomal Dominant Alzheimer's Disease (ADAD)." The Banner Alzheimer’s Institute also concurred, as the executive director Eric Reiman said, "We’re disappointed that crenezumab did not show a significant clinical benefit."

=== CREAD study ===
In July 2015, Genentech announced it was moving crenezumab into a phase III study, known as CREAD, to evaluate the effects of crenezumab in patients with prodromal-to-mild Alzheimer's Disease. This study aims to enroll 750 individuals between the ages of 50 and 85 at 233 international sites. The primary outcome measure for this trial is change in clinical dementia rating, with secondary outcomes of changes in cognition, quality of life, and time to clinically evident decline, among others. The study was expected to conclude in 2021 but Roche has withdrawn its support in the middle of Phase III due to the initial assessment.

As the studies gave no positive results, Genentech ended the last two clinical trials (CREAD 1 and CREAD 2) in January 2019.
