= John C. Morris (neurologist) =

American neurologist and Alzheimer's disease researcher

- Education: University of Rochester School of Medicine and Dentistry
- Known for: Clinical Dementia Rating; Uniform Data Set; founding principal investigator of the Dominantly Inherited Alzheimer Network (2008–2015); research on the preclinical phase of Alzheimer's disease
- Awards: Potamkin Prize (2005); MetLife Foundation Award for Medical Research in Alzheimer's Disease (2004); Alzheimer's Association Lifetime Achievement Award (2004); Carl and Gerty Cori Faculty Achievement Award (2010); Washington University Second Century Award (2013)
- Scientific career
- Fields: Neurology, Alzheimer's disease research
- Workplaces: Washington University School of Medicine

John C. Morris is an American neurologist known for his work on the clinical assessment and early detection of Alzheimer's disease. He is the Harvey A. and Dorismae Hacker Friedman Distinguished Professor of Neurology at Washington University School of Medicine in St. Louis. He served as Director of the Charles F. and Joanne Knight Alzheimer's Disease Research Center from 2003 to 2023 and has served as co-director since July 2023.

Morris developed the current version and scoring rules of the Clinical Dementia Rating (CDR), which became a widely used instrument for staging dementia severity in clinical trials and observational studies. He also led the National Institute on Aging task force that created the Uniform Data Set (UDS), the standardized assessment protocol used across federally funded Alzheimer's Disease Research Centers. His 1999 research with Joseph L. Price provided early evidence that Alzheimer neuropathology can be present in cognitively normal older adults, contributing to the recognition of a preclinical phase of Alzheimer's disease.

Morris was the inaugural Principal Investigator of the Dominantly Inherited Alzheimer Network (DIAN) from 2008 to 2015. DIAN is an international study of familial Alzheimer's disease that has served as a model for prevention trials.

== Education ==
Morris received his medical degree from the University of Rochester School of Medicine and Dentistry. He completed a residency in internal medicine at Akron General Medical Center and a residency in neurology at Cleveland Metropolitan General Hospital, followed by a postdoctoral fellowship in neuropharmacology at Washington University School of Medicine.

== Career ==
Morris joined the faculty of Washington University School of Medicine after completing his training. He served as Director of the Knight Alzheimer's Disease Research Center from 2003 to 2023 and has served as co-director since July 2023. He has also directed the center's Memory and Aging Project, a longitudinal study of aging that began in 1979.

In 2008, the National Institute on Aging appointed him the inaugural Principal Investigator of the Dominantly Inherited Alzheimer Network (DIAN), an international consortium studying individuals with genetic mutations that cause Early-onset Alzheimer's disease. The network has characterized biomarker changes during the preclinical phase and has supported prevention trials.

Morris has supported efforts to increase diversity in Alzheimer's research. In 2000 he helped establish the Knight ADRC's African American Advisory Board to advise on outreach strategies.

== Research ==
Morris's research has focused on the clinical staging of dementia, the early biological stages of Alzheimer's disease, and efforts to make research more inclusive.

=== Clinical Dementia Rating and Uniform Data Set ===
Morris developed the current version and scoring rules of the Clinical Dementia Rating (CDR) in 1993. The instrument is used in clinical trials and observational studies because of its reliability and ability to capture both cognitive and functional impairment.

He led the development of the Uniform Data Set (UDS) in 2006, which standardized assessments across U.S. Alzheimer Disease Research Centers.

=== Preclinical Alzheimer's disease ===
In 1999, Morris and Joseph L. Price showed that Alzheimer neuropathology could be present in cognitively normal older adults. This work contributed to the later development of research frameworks that recognize a long preclinical phase of Alzheimer's disease.

=== Dominantly Inherited Alzheimer Network (DIAN) ===
Morris was the inaugural Principal Investigator of the Dominantly Inherited Alzheimer Network (DIAN) from 2008 to 2015. The network has mapped the sequence of biomarker changes in mutation carriers and has become a model for prevention trials targeting the preclinical stage.

=== Racial disparities in research ===
Morris led a 2019 study that identified differences in Alzheimer's biomarkers between African Americans and non-Hispanic white participants. The findings have been discussed in the context of health equity in neuroscience research.

== Awards and honors ==
Morris received the Potamkin Prize for Research in Pick's, Alzheimer's, and Related Dementias from the American Academy of Neurology in 2005 and the MetLife Foundation Award for Medical Research in Alzheimer's Disease in 2004. He received the Alzheimer's Association Lifetime Achievement Award in 2004 and was the Medical and Scientific Honoree of the Alzheimer's Association in 2013. From Washington University School of Medicine he received the Carl and Gerty Cori Faculty Achievement Award in 2010, and from Washington University he received the Second Century Award in 2013. He also received the Washington University Academic Women's Network Mentor Award in 2008.

== Selected publications ==
- Morris, J.C. (1993). "The Clinical Dementia Rating (CDR): current version and scoring rules". Neurology. 43 (11): 2412–2414.
- Price, J.L.; Morris, J.C. (1999). "Tangles and plaques in nondemented aging and 'preclinical' Alzheimer's disease". Annals of Neurology. 45 (3): 358–368.
- Morris, J.C. et al. (2006). "The Uniform Data Set (UDS): clinical and cognitive variables and descriptive data from Alzheimer Disease Centers". Alzheimer Disease and Associated Disorders. 20 (4): 210–216.
- Morris, J.C. et al. (2019). "Assessment of Racial Disparities in Biomarkers for Alzheimer Disease". JAMA Neurology. 76 (3): 264–273.
