= Donanemab =

Monoclonal antibody against amyloid beta

Monoclonal antibody
- Type: Whole antibody
- Source: Humanized (from mouse)
- Target: Amyloid beta

Clinical data
- Trade names: Kisunla
- Other names: LY3002813, donanemab-azbt
- AHFS/Drugs.com: Monograph
- MedlinePlus: a624048
- License data: US DailyMed: Donanemab
- Routes of administration: Intravenous
- ATC code: N06DX05 (WHO)

Legal status
- Legal status: CA: ℞-only; US: ℞-only; EU: Rx-only

Identifiers
- CAS Number: 1931944-80-7
- DrugBank: DB16647
- UNII: 1ADB65P1KK
- KEGG: D11500

Chemical and physical data
- Formula: C_{6452}H_{10038}N_{1708}O_{2013}S_{42}
- Molar mass: 145089.74 g·mol^{−1}

Donanemab, sold under the brand name Kisunla, is a monoclonal antibody used for the treatment of Alzheimer's disease. It has no clinically significant effect in the treatment of Alzheimer's disease.

The most common side effects include amyloid-related imaging abnormalities, which are brain hemorrhages and brain swelling, which can cause strokes, seizures, falls and trouble thinking. Brain hemorrhage and swelling occurred in 36.8% of people taking donanemab and 14.9% of people taking placebo. Headache and allergic reactions to the medication were other common side effects.

Donanemab was approved for medical use in the United States in July 2024. Most of the members of the US Food and Drug Administration (FDA) advisory panel had financial conflicts of interest. Treatment is intended for people with mild cognitive impairment or mild dementia stage of disease, which is the same population the treatment was studied in the clinical trials. Several public interest groups spoke out in FDA hearings against approval of the drug. Donanemab was developed by Eli Lilly and Company.

== Medical uses ==
It has no clinically significant effect in the treatment of Alzheimer's disease.

In the US, donanemab is indicated for the treatment of Alzheimer's disease for people with mild cognitive impairment or mild dementia stage of disease.

In the EU, donanemab is indicated for the treatment of adults with a clinical diagnosis of mild cognitive impairment and mild dementia due to Alzheimer's disease (early symptomatic Alzheimer's disease) who are apolipoprotein E ε4 (ApoE ε4) heterozygotes or non-carriers with confirmed amyloid pathology.

== Side effects ==
The US Food and Drug Administration (FDA) label for donanemab contains a boxed warning about amyloid-related imaging abnormalities.

Side effects may include infusion-related reactions, with symptoms such as flu-like symptoms, nausea, vomiting and changes in blood pressure, and hypersensitivity reactions, including anaphylaxis (severe, life-threatening allergic reaction) and angioedema (swelling).

Donanemab can cause serious side effects. The most common side effects of donanemab include ARIA, headache, and infusion-related reactions.

ARIA refers to temporary swelling in areas of the brain (ARIA-E), or small spots of bleeding in or on the surface of the brain (ARIA-H). The swelling in areas of the brain usually resolves over time, while the small spots of bleeding in or on the surface of the brain may not resolve. Most people who develop ARIA do not get symptoms; however, some people, especially those with swelling in the brain, may have symptoms such as headache, confusion, dizziness, vision changes, nausea, seizures, and difficulty walking. Some of these symptoms may be serious and life-threatening. ARIA can be fatal. While ARIA may occur any time during treatment with donanemab, it has most frequently been observed during the first 24 weeks of treatment.

Some people may also develop larger areas of bleeding in the brain while taking donanemab which may also be serious and life-threatening. Some people may be at a higher risk of developing bleeding in the brain if they are taking medicines to reduce blood clots from forming (antithrombotic medicines) while receiving donanemab.

Some people have a genetic risk factor (homozygous apolipoprotein E [ApoE] ε4 gene carriers) that may cause an increased risk for ARIA.

Allergic reactions associated with donanemab include swelling of the face, lips, mouth, or eyelids, difficulty breathing, and hives. Infusion-related reactions may also occur. Symptoms of infusion-related reactions include chills, irritation of skin, nausea, vomiting, sweating, headache, chest pain, and problems breathing.

=== Cerebral edema ===
In larger doses of donanemab, some people developed a form of cerebral edema (brain swelling) called "amyloid-related imaging abnormalities with edema or effusions" (ARIA-E); some of these people were asymptomatic while others displayed edema.

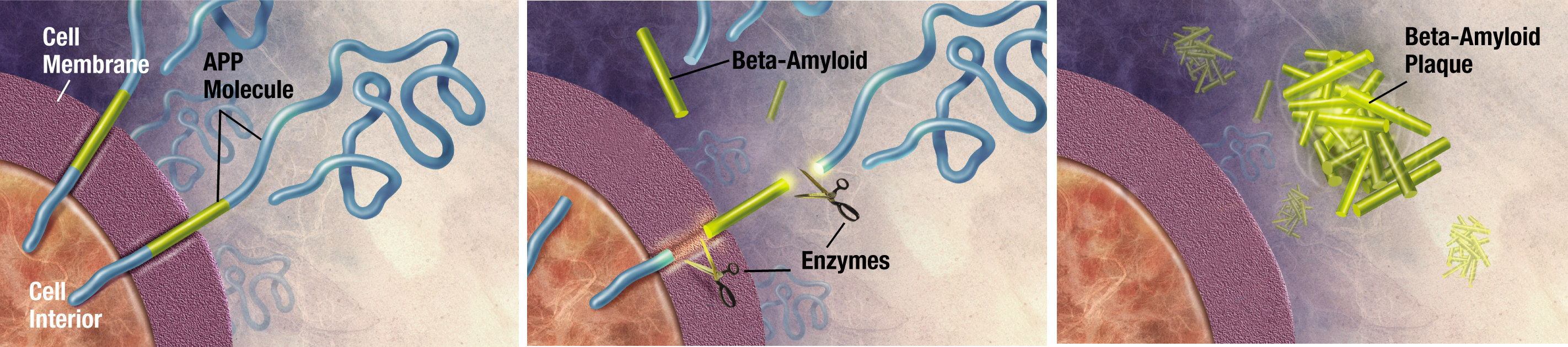
Enzymes act on the APP (Amyloid precursor protein) and cut it into fragments of protein, one of which is called beta-amyloid and its crucial in the formation of senile plaques in Alzheimer. Image created in 2008.

== History ==
In the United States and Japan, Eli Lilly ran the phase I study from May 2013 to August 2016. The study was conducted on people with mild Alzheimer's disease shown through a positive amyloid PET scan that was conducted on each individual. 100 participants were injected intravenously with donanemab up to four times monthly. Phase I was part of a multi-armed study that used one control group across the different trials. The positive result indicated that the participants had excess amyloid protein in the brain depicting an early sign of Alzheimer's disease. Each month, doses of 0.1 mg/kg to 10 mg/kg were injected into males and non-fertile females at an average age of 74. A phase II trial was then performed for 72 weeks with 257 participants. In May 2023, the company reported its phase III study.

== Society and culture ==
=== Legal status ===
In July 2024, donanemab was approved for medical use in the United States. The US Food and Drug Administration (FDA) granted the application for donanemab fast track, priority review, and breakthrough therapy designations.

In October 2024, donanemab was approved for medical use in the United Kingdom by the Medicines and Healthcare products Regulatory Agency.

In March 2025, the Committee for Medicinal Products for Human Use (CHMP) of the European Medicines Agency recommended the refusal of a marketing authorization for donanemab for the treatment of early Alzheimer's disease. In June 2025, the CHMP started a re-examination of its refusal. Donanemab was authorized for medical use in the European Union in September 2025.

=== Economics ===
The list price for donanemab is US$32,000 for a course of therapy lasting a year.

=== Names ===
Donanemab is the international nonproprietary name.

Donanemab is sold under the brand name Kisunla.

== Research ==
Improvements in amyloid imaging technology have linked the excess Aβ peptide outside the cell with the development of Alzheimer's disease. The overproduction of the Aβ peptide creates a plaque in certain parts of the brain, disrupting neurotransmission. Donanemab attacks the soluble and insoluble plaque buildup, slowing the progression of the disease.
