= Diranersen =

Clinical data
- Other names: BIIB-080; BIIB080; IONIS-MAPTRx; ISIS-814907
- Routes of administration: Intrathecal injection
- Drug class: Antisense oligonucleotide against tau

Identifiers
- CAS Number: 2304711-06-4
- PubChem SID: 474493443
- UNII: 96J3L33PWD

Diranersen (INN; developmental code names BIIB080, IONIS-MAPTRx, and ISIS-814907) is an antisense oligonucleotide (ASO) against tau which is under development for the treatment of Alzheimer's disease. It is given by intrathecal injection. The drug is under development by Ionis Pharmaceuticals and Biogen. As of July 2026, it is in phase 2 clinical trials for Alzheimer's disease. Diranersen has been found to decrease levels of tau in cerebrospinal fluid by 30 to 65% and was reported to slightly slow cognitive decline, by 26%, in a preliminary phase 2 trial. This degree of slowing is on par with that of existing anti-amyloid antibodies. The drug is one of the most clinically advanced anti-tau drugs under development.

== See also ==
- Anti-tau drug
