= Anti-tau drug =

- Drug class

Class identifiers
- Synonyms: Tau inhibitor
- Mechanism of action: Block or inhibit tau
- Biological target: Tau
- Chemical class: Monoclonal antibodies; Antisense oligonucleotides

Legal status

An anti-tau drug, or a tau inhibitor, is a drug which blocks or inhibits tau. They include anti-tau antibodies like semorinemab, anti-tau antisense oligonucleotides like diranersen, and anti-tau vaccines. Anti-tau drugs are under development for the treatment of tauopathies like Alzheimer's disease.

== See also ==
- Anti-amyloid antibodies
- Anti-α-synuclein drug
