= UB-311 =

Alzheimer's disease drug under development

Vaccine description
- Target: β-Amyloid

Clinical data
- Other names: UB311
- Routes of administration: Intramuscular injection

UB-311 is a vaccine targeting β-amyloid and hence anti-amyloid agent which is under development for the treatment of Alzheimer's disease. It is under development by Vaxxinity (delisted from stock market in May 2024). Meningoencephalitis has been described as a possible side effect of the drug. As of February 2024, the drug is in phase 2 clinical trials. In May 2022, UB-311 received fast-track designation for Alzheimer's disease from the United States Food and Drug Administration (FDA).
