= Davangere Devanand =

Indian psychiatrist

Davangere P. Devanand is Division Chief of Geriatric Psychiatry in the Department of Psychiatry and Professor of Clinical Psychiatry and Neurology at the Columbia University College of Physicians and Surgeons.

Currently, he is a principal investigator of Columbia University's Memory Disorders Center, and former co-director of the Late Life Depression Clinic, now known as the Clinic for Aging, Anxiety, and Mood Disorders, at the New York State Psychiatric Institute. He is also an associate editor of the journal Alzheimer Disease and Associated Disorders.

== Awards ==
- 2014, APF Jack Weinberg Memorial Award for Geriatric Psychiatry, American Psychiatric Association
