= MCI Screen =

Neuropsycholigical test

- Purpose: check mild cognitive impairment

The MCI Screen is a brief neuropsychological test checking for mild cognitive impairment (MCI).

The protocol consists of an immediate recall task, a triadic comparison task, a judgment task, a delayed free recall task, a cued-recall task, and a rehearsed recall task. It is scored using correspondence analysis and statistical methods for differentiating normal cognitive function from Mild cognitive impairment. The methodology for scoring the MCI Screen was developed by the Embic Corporation (formerly Medical Care Corporation), a privately held California Corporation.

It was derived from the protocol of the CERAD 10-word recall test.

== Validation ==
The MCI Screen was validated in a study on 471 community-dwelling adults whose scores on the Clinical Dementia Rating Scale ranged from 0 (normal: N=119), 0.5 (mild cognitive impairment: N=95), to 1 (mild dementia: N=257). According to a 2005 publication in The Proceedings of the National Academy of Sciences, the MCI Screen has overall accuracy of 98% with sensitivity of 97% for mild cognitive impairment or mild dementia, and 88% specificity for normal aging. Clinical studies in the USA have shown that the MCI Screen detects early-stage memory loss due to multiple underlying medical conditions including Alzheimer's disease and cerebrovascular disease. Japan-based studies have demonstrated cross-cultural validity of the MCI Screen in clinical and academic settings with accuracy levels equal to those in the USA.
