= Alzheimer Society of Canada =

Canadian health charity

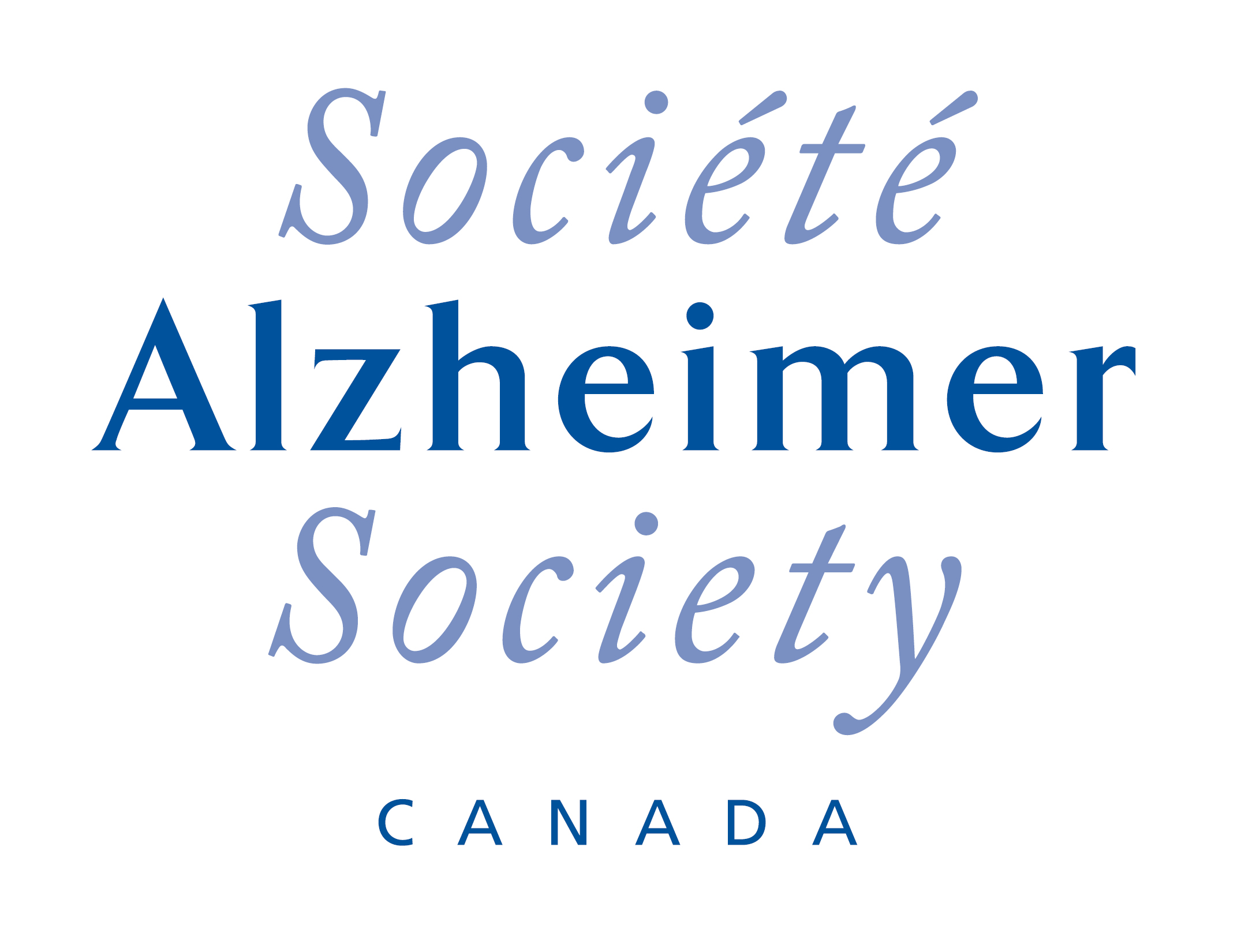
- Abbreviation: ASC
- Formation: 1978
- Type: Alzheimer's disease charity
- Legal status: Active
- Headquarters: Toronto, Ontario, Canada
- Region served: Canada
- Official languages: English, French
- Board Chair: Ray Bisson
- CEO: Christina Scicluna
- Staff: 20 to 25
- Website: www.alzheimer.ca

The Alzheimer Society of Canada (ASC) is a Canadian health charity for people living with Alzheimer's disease (AD) and other dementias. The Society partners with Alzheimer Societies in Canadian provinces to offer information, support and education programs for people with dementia, their families and caregivers. The Society also funds Canadian researchers working to find the causes and a cure.

Some of their work is funded by Eli Lilly, who make the medication donanemab for AD which appears to have no clinically significant effect.

It was founded in 1978 and is based in Toronto, Ontario, Canada. The Society's vision is a world without Alzheimer's disease and other dementias.

== History ==
In 1977, the Alzheimer Society began as a group of researchers concerned about the lack of support for people with Alzheimer's disease. Their focus was family support, education and research. The next year, the organization was incorporated federally under the name Société Alzheimer Society, the first organization of its kind in the world.

In 1984, the Society was one of the eight founding members of Alzheimer's Disease International.

In 1989, the Alzheimer Society Research Program was launched, offering upcoming researchers as well as established ones an opportunity to receive grants to further their work.

Since 2003, the Alzheimer Society of Canada has appointed a person living with dementia to its board of directors. The Society also includes people living with dementia in their work through their Advisory Group, which supports and guides the Society's initiatives in dementia research, education and advocacy.

In 2010, the Society released Rising Tide: The Impact of Dementia on Canadian Society, describing the health and economic burden of dementia in Canada over the next 30 years, and alerting the Canadian public and all levels of government to the need for policies and approaches to address the looming dementia crisis.

Starting with the release in 2011 of Guidelines for Care: Person-centred care of people with dementia living in care homes, the Alzheimer Society of Canada has led a multi-phased project to conduct studies and develop resources promoting the practice of person-centred care in all stages of the disease.

In 2018, the Alzheimer Society of Canada launched the first-ever Canadian Charter of Rights for People with Dementia, written by and for people living with dementia. The Charter's intention is to empower people living with dementia in situations where they experience stigma, are treated unfairly, discriminated against or are denied access to appropriate care. The Charter is the culmination of over a year’s work by the Society’s Advisory Group of people with dementia.

== Programs and services ==
In their 2016 registered charity information return filed with the Canada Revenue Agency, the Alzheimer Society of Canada listed their ongoing programs as:

- Assisting provincial Alzheimer Society (AS) organizations to provide information and educational materials to the public;
- Administering and funding the AS national peer-reviewed research grants and awards program;
- Creating public awareness of the social and personal implications of Alzheimer's disease and related dementia;
- Updating and maintaining the national website;
- Participating in Alzheimer's Disease International (ADI)

Canadians looking for individual and family support for dementia are referred to provincial and local Societies for access to programs and services in their region.

MedicAlert Safely Home is a joint program of the Alzheimer Society of Canada and the Medic Alert Foundation to help people living with dementia who may go missing. The program provides a MedicAlert identification bracelet and a registry of information that helps first responders reconnect the person with family and get them safely home.

The Society offers First Link, a program that connects people diagnosed with dementia to their local Alzheimer Society and other community resources as early in the disease process as possible.

The Alzheimer Society of Canada, with the provincial Alzheimer Societies and the local Alzheimer Societies in Ontario and Quebec, are registered as separate charities and operate in cooperation using a federated model.

== Research ==
Together with its partners, as of 2020 the Alzheimer Society of Canada has contributed over $64 million to dementia research in Canada, supporting projects that investigate the causes, treatments and an eventual cure for the disease, as well as quality-of-life research that leads to improvements in care.

In September 2022, the Alzheimer Society of Canada released a new report called "Navigating the Path Forward for Dementia in Canada." This report is the first volume of the Society's Landmark Study.

== Dementia numbers in Canada ==
The Society estimates that there are over 500,000 Canadians living with dementia today. By 2030, if nothing changes in Canada, this figure will increase to nearly a million.

== Events ==
Alzheimer's Awareness Month

Every January, the Alzheimer Society of Canada launches a campaign to raise awareness about Alzheimer's disease and other dementias and to reduce stigma.

IG Wealth Management Walk for Alzheimer's

The IG Wealth Management Walk for Alzheimer's is Canada's biggest fundraiser for Alzheimer's disease and other dementias. Monies raised support programs and services to improve the quality of life for people living with dementia and their families, and support other activities like education and public awareness. Walks take place every year in over 400 communities across Canada.

== See also ==
- Alzheimer Society of Ontario, based in Ontario
- Alzheimer's Society, based in the United Kingdom
- Alzheimer Disease International, based in the United Kingdom
- Alzheimer's Association, based in the United States
- Journal of Alzheimer's Disease
- Dolly Dastoor
