= Cerebral edema =

Excess accumulation of fluid in the brain

- Other names: Brain edema, Cerebral oedema, Brain swelling
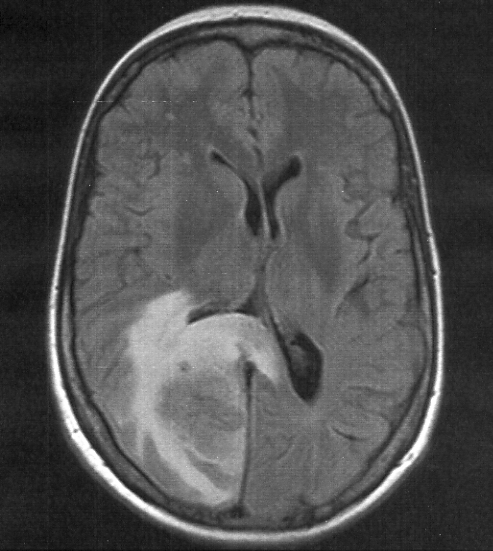
- Skull MRI (T2 flair) of a brain metastasis with accompanying edema
- Specialty: Emergency medicine, neurocritical care, neurosurgery
- Symptoms: Headache, nausea, vomiting, decreased consciousness, seizures
- Complications: Permanent neurological damage, brain death
- Differential diagnosis: Ischemic stroke, Subdural hematoma; Epidural hematoma, Hyponatremia; Intracerebral hematoma, Brain tumor; Intraventricular hemorrhage; Subarachnoid hemorrhage; Hydrocephalus, Brain abscess; Traumatic brain injury; Hepatic encephalopathy
- Treatment: Controlling intracranial pressure, external ventricular drain, surgically removing a part of the skull
- Medication: Mannitol, hypertonic saline

Cerebral edema is excess accumulation of fluid (edema) in the intracellular or extracellular spaces of the brain. This typically causes impaired nerve function, increased pressure within the skull, and can eventually lead to direct compression of brain tissue and blood vessels. Symptoms vary based on the location and extent of edema and generally include headaches, nausea, vomiting, seizures, drowsiness, visual disturbances, dizziness, and in severe cases, death.

Cerebral edema is commonly seen in a variety of brain injuries including ischemic stroke, subarachnoid hemorrhage, traumatic brain injury, subdural, epidural, or intracerebral hematoma, hydrocephalus, brain cancer, brain infections, low blood sodium levels, high altitude, and acute liver failure. Diagnosis is based on symptoms and physical examination findings and confirmed by serial neuroimaging (computed tomography scans and magnetic resonance imaging).

The treatment of cerebral edema depends on the cause and includes monitoring of the person's airway and intracranial pressure, proper positioning, controlled hyperventilation, medications, fluid management, steroids. Extensive cerebral edema can also be treated surgically with a decompressive craniectomy. Cerebral edema is a major cause of brain damage and contributes significantly to the mortality of ischemic strokes and traumatic brain injuries.

As cerebral edema is present with many common cerebral pathologies, the epidemiology of the disease is not easily defined. The incidence of this disorder should be considered in terms of its potential causes and is present in most cases of traumatic brain injury, central nervous system tumors, brain ischemia, and intracerebral hemorrhage. For example, malignant brain edema was present in roughly 31% of people with ischemic strokes within 30 days after onset.

== Signs and symptoms ==
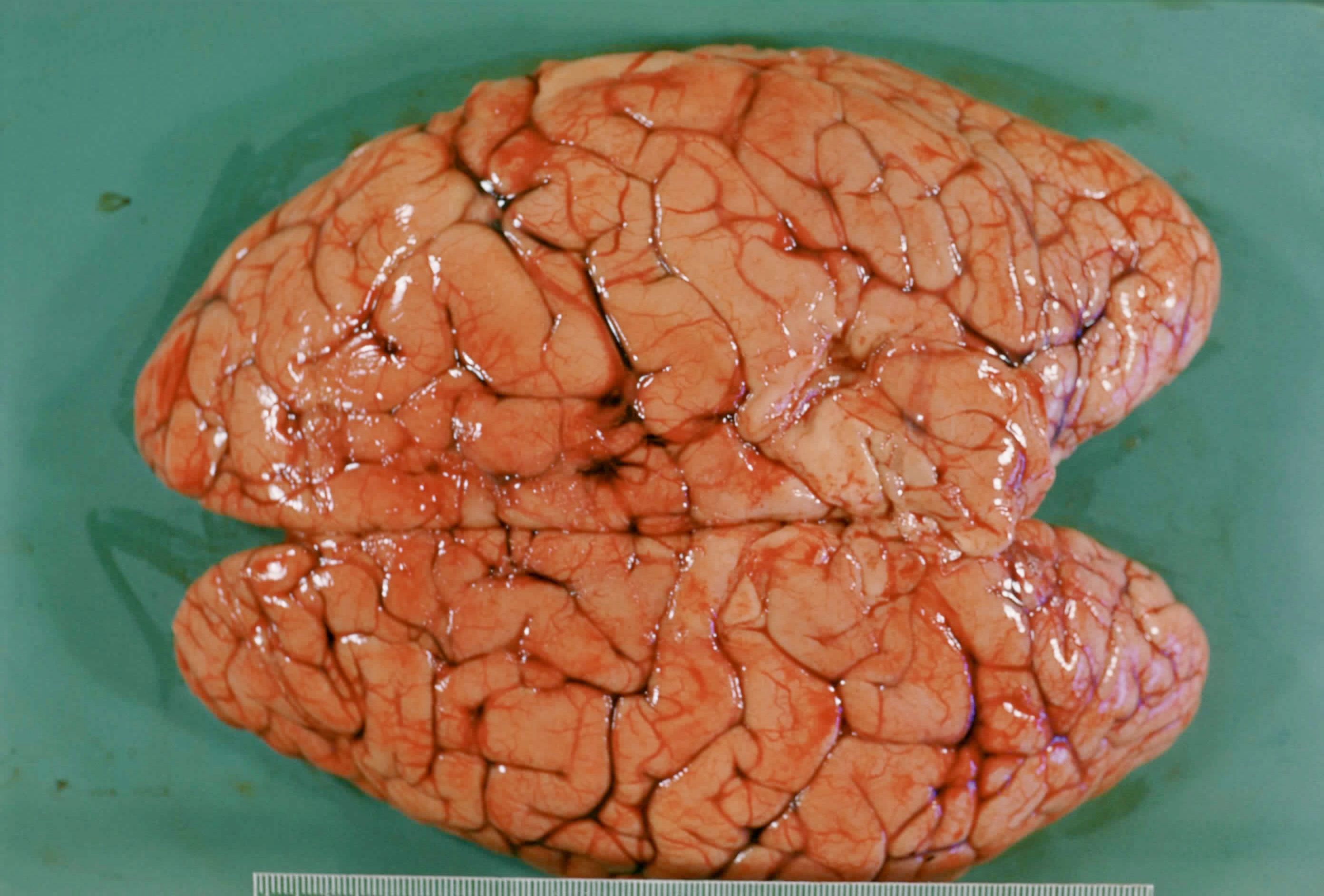
Cerebral oedema, glioma right cerebral cortex

The extent and severity of the symptoms of cerebral edema depend on the exact etiology but are generally related to an acute increase of the pressure within the skull. As the skull is a fixed and inelastic space, the accumulation of cerebral edema can displace and compress vital brain tissue, cerebral spinal fluid, and blood vessels, according to the Monro–Kellie doctrine.

Increased intracranial pressure (ICP) is a life-threatening surgical emergency marked by symptoms of headache, nausea, vomiting, decreased consciousness. Symptoms are frequently accompanied by visual disturbances such as gaze paresis, reduced vision, and dizziness. Increased pressures within the skull can cause a compensatory elevation of blood pressure to maintain cerebral blood flow, which, when associated with irregular breathing and a decreased heart rate, is called the Cushing reflex. The Cushing reflex often indicates compression of the brain on brain tissue and blood vessels, leading to decreased blood flow to the brain and eventually death.

== Causes ==
Cerebral edema is frequently encountered in acute brain injuries from a variety of origins, including but not limited to:

- Traumatic brain injury
- Stroke
- Tumors
- Infections (such as a brain abscess or meningitis)
- Hepatic encephalopathy
- Posterior reversible encephalopathy syndrome
- Radiation-induced brain edema
- Post-surgical changes
- Amyloid-related imaging abnormalities associated with edema (ARIA-E)
- Hyponatremia
- High-altitude cerebral edema

=== Risk factors ===
Cerebral edema is present with many common cerebral pathologies and risk factors for development of cerebral edema will depend on the cause. The following were reliable predictors for development of early cerebral edema in ischemic strokes:

- Younger age
- Higher severity of symptoms on the National Institutes of Health Stroke Scale
- Signs of current ischemia on clinical exam
- Decreased level of consciousness
- Hyper dense artery sign and larger affected area on CT imaging
- Higher blood glucose

== Classification ==
Cerebral edema has been traditional classified into two major sub-types: cytotoxic and vasogenic cerebral edema. This simple classification helps guide medical decision making and treatment of patients affected with cerebral edema. There are, however, several more differentiated types including but not limited to interstitial, osmotic, hydrostatic, and high altitude associated edema. Within one affected person, many individual sub-types can be present simultaneously.

The following individual sub-types have been identified:

=== Cytotoxic ===
In general, cytotoxic edema is linked to cell death in the brain through excessive cellular swelling. During cerebral ischemia for example, the blood–brain barrier remains intact but decreased blood flow and glucose supply leads to a disruption in cellular metabolism and creation of energy sources, such as adenosine triphosphate (ATP). Exhaustion of energy sources impairs functioning of the sodium and potassium pump in the cell membrane, leading to cellular retention of sodium ions. Accumulation of sodium in the cell causes a rapid uptake of water through osmosis, with subsequent swelling of the cells. The ultimate consequence of cytotoxic edema is the oncotic death of neurons. The swelling of the individual cells of the brain is the main distinguishing characteristic of cytotoxic edema, as opposed to vasogenic edema, wherein the influx of fluid is typically seen in the interstitial space rather than within the cells themselves. Researchers have proposed that "cellular edema" may be more preferable to the term "cytotoxic edema" given the distinct swelling and lack of consistent "toxic" substance involved.

There are several clinical conditions in which cytotoxic edema is present:

- Commonly caused by traumatic brain injuries, intracerebral hemorrhage, and the early phase of ischemic stroke.
- Also seen in acute liver failure where toxic waste, most notably ammonia, accumulates in the blood stream and crosses the blood–brain barrier. Hyperammonemia in central nervous system (CNS) cells causes oxidative stress and mitochrondrial dysfunction, leading to astrocytic cell swelling. Additionally, ammonia is converted to glutamine in CNS cells which acts as an osmolyte and draws further water into the cell through osmosis. Cerebral edema occurs most commonly in conjunction with a rapid rise in ammonia levels.
- Toxic exposures to methionine sulfoximine, cuprizone, isoniazid, triethyltin, hexachlorophene, and hydrogen cyanide have been associated with cytotoxic edema and swelling of astrocytic cells.
- Hypoxia, anoxia can lead to cytotoxic edema through several mechanisms

=== Vasogenic ===
Extracellular brain edema, or vasogenic edema, is caused by an increase in the permeability of the blood–brain barrier. The blood–brain barrier consists of astrocytes and pericytes joined with adhesion proteins producing tight junctions. Return of blood flow to these cells after an ischemic stroke can cause excitotoxicity and oxidative stress leading to dysfunction of the endothelial cells and disruption of the blood-brain barrier. The breakdown of the tight endothelial junctions that make up the blood–brain barrier causes extravasation of fluid, ions, and plasma proteins, such as albumin, into the brain parenchyma. Accumulation of extracellular fluid increases brain volume and then intracranial pressure causing the symptoms of cerebral edema.

There are several clinical conditions in which vasogenic edema is present:

- CNS tumors, like glioblastoma and meningioma
- Infections like meningitis, abscess, and encephalitis
- Inflammatory central nervous system disease such as multiple sclerosis
- Brain hemorrhage
- Traumatic brain injuries can lead to increased intracranial pressure, local damage, reduced cerebral blood flow, and focal ischemia secondary to vasogenic edema.
- Late stage of ischemic stroke after rapid recovery from cytotoxic edema
- Hypertensive encephalopathy
- Radiation injury

=== Ionic (Osmotic) ===
In ionic edema, the solute concentration (osmolality) of the brain exceeds that of the plasma and the abnormal pressure gradient leads to accumulation of water intake into the brain parenchyma through the process of osmosis. The blood-brain barrier is intact and maintains the osmotic gradient.

The solute concentration of the blood plasma can be diluted by several mechanisms:

- Improper administration of intravenous fluids, isotonic or hypotonic.
- Excessive water intake, syndrome of inappropriate antidiuretic hormone (SIADH).
- Rapid reduction of blood glucose in diabetic ketoacidosis or hyperosmolar hyperglycemic state.
- Hemodialysis has been associated with ionic edema and cellular swelling.
- Cerebral edema is a potentially life-threatening complication of severely decreased sodium ion concentration in the blood (hyponatremia).

Ionic brain edema can also occur around the sites of brain hemorrhages, infarcts, or contusions due to a local plasma osmolality pressure gradient when compared to the high osmolality in the affected tissue.

=== Interstitial (hydrocephalic) ===
Interstitial edema can be best characterized by a noncomunnicating hydrocephalus where there is an obstruction to the outflow of cerebrospinal fluid within the ventricular system. The obstruction creates a rise in the intraventricular pressure and causes CSF to flow through the wall of the ventricles into the extracellular fluid within brain. The fluid has roughly the same composition of CSF.

Other causes of interstitial edema include but are not limited to communicating hydrocephalus, and normal pressure hydrocephalus.

=== Hydrostatic ===
Hydrostatic extracellular brain edema is typically caused by severe arterial hypertension. A difference in the hydrostatic pressure within the arterial system relative to the endothelial cells allows ultrafiltration of water, ions, and low molecular weight substances (such as glucose, small amino acids) into the brain parenchyma. The blood-brain barrier is intact usually and the extent of the edema depends on the arterial pressure. The regulatory processes of the brain circulation can function up to systolic arterial pressures of 150 mm Hg and will have impaired function at higher blood pressures.

=== Combined types of cerebral edema ===
Cytotoxic, osmotic, and vasogenic edema exist on a continuum. The mechanism of the cause of cerebral edema can often overlap between these types. In most instances, cytotoxic and vasogenic edema occur together. When the two edema types evolve simultaneously, the damage of one type reaches a limit and will bring about the other type of injury. For example, when cytotoxic edema occurs in the endothelial cells of the blood–brain barrier, oncotic cell death contributes to loss of integrity of the blood–brain barrier and promotes the progression to vasogenic edema. When brain edema types are combined, there is typically a primary form and the edema type and context of the cause must be determined in order to start appropriate medical or surgical therapy. The use of specific MRI techniques has allowed for some differentiation between the mechanisms.

=== Subtypes ===
==== High-altitude cerebral edema ====
If not properly acclimatized to high altitude, a person may be negatively affected by the lower oxygen concentration available. These hypoxia-related illnesses include acute mountain sickness (AMS), high-altitude pulmonary edema, and high-altitude cerebral edema (HACE). High-altitude cerebral edema is a severe and sometimes fatal form of altitude sickness that results from capillary fluid leakage due to the effects of hypoxia on the mitochondria-rich endothelial cells of the blood–brain barrier. The edema can be characterized by vasogenic cerebral edema with symptoms of impaired consciousness and truncal ataxia.

Altitude-related illnesses can be prevented most effectively with slow ascent to high altitudes, an average ascent of 300 to 500 meters per day is recommended. Pharmacological prophylaxis with acetazolamide or corticosteroids can be used in non pre-acclimatized individuals. If symptoms of high-altitude cerebral edema do not resolve or worsen, immediate descent is necessary, and symptoms can be improved with administration of dexamethasone.

==== Amyloid-related imaging abnormalities – edema ====
Amyloid-related imaging abnormalities (ARIA) are abnormal differences seen in neuroimaging of Alzheimer's disease patients given targeted amyloid-modifying therapies. Human monoclonal antibodies such as aducanumab, solanezumab, and bapineuzumab have been associated with these neuroimaging changes and additionally, cerebral edema. These therapies are associated with dysfunction of the tight endothelial junctions of the blood-brain barrier, leading to vasogenic edema as described above. In addition to edema, these therapies are associated with microhemorrhages in the brain known as ARIA-H. Familiarity with ARIA can aid radiologists and clinicians in determining optimal management for those affected.

==== Posterior reversible encephalopathy syndrome ====
Posterior reversible encephalopathy syndrome (PRES) is a rare clinical disease characterized by cerebral edema. The exact pathophysiology, or cause, of the syndrome is still debated but is hypothesized to be related to the disruption of the blood-brain barrier. The syndrome features acute neurological symptoms and reversible subcortical vasogenic edema predominantly involving the parieto-occipital areas on MR imaging. PRES in general has a benign course, but PRES-related intracranial hemorrhage has been associated with a poor prognosis.

==== Idiopathic delayed-onset edema ====
Deep brain stimulation (DBS) is effective treatment for several neurological and psychiatric disorders, most notably Parkinson's disease. DBS is not without risks and although rare, idiopathic delayed-onset edema (IDE) surrounding the DBS leads have been reported. Symptoms can be mild and nonspecific, including reduction of the stimulation effect, and can be confused for other causes of edema. Thus, imaging is recommended to rule out other causes. The condition is generally self-limiting and the exact mechanism of the cause is unexplained. Early identification can help persons affected avoid unnecessary surgical procedures or antibiotic treatments.

==== Massive brain swelling after cranioplasty ====
Decompressive craniectomy is frequently performed in cases of resistant intracranial hypertension secondary to several neurological conditions and is commonly followed by cranioplasty. Complications, such as infection and hematomas after cranioplasty occur in roughly about a third of cases. Massive brain swelling after cranioplasty (MSBC) is a rare and potentially fatal complication of an uneventful cranioplasty that has recently been elucidated. Preoperative sinking skin flap (SSF) and intracranial hypotension were factors associated with the development of MSBC after cranioplasty. Data suggests that pathologic changes are triggered immediately following the procedure, especially an acute increase in intracranial pressure.

==== Radiation-induced brain edema ====
With the rise of sophisticated treatment modalities such as gamma knife, Cyberknife, and intensity-modulated radiotherapy, a large number of individuals with brain tumors are treated with radiosurgery and radiotherapy. Radiation-induced brain edema (RIBE) is a potentially life-threatening complication of brain tissue radiation and is characterized radiation necrosis, endothelial cell dysfunction, increased capillary permeability, and breakdown of the blood–brain barrier. Symptoms include headache, seizure, psychomotor slowing, irritability, and focal neurological deficits. Options for management of RIBE are limited and include corticosteroids, antiplatelet drugs, anticoagulants, hyperbaric oxygen therapy, multivitamins, and bevacizumab.

==== Brain tumor-associated cerebral edema ====
This kind of cerebral edema is a significant cause of morbidity and mortality in patients with brain tumors and characterized by a disruption of the blood brain barrier and vasogenic edema. The exact mechanism is unclear but hypothesized that cancerous glial cells (glioma) of the brain can increase secretion of vascular endothelial growth factor (VEGF), which weakens the tight junctions of the blood–brain barrier. Historically, corticosteroids such as dexamethasone were used to reduce brain tumor-associated vascular permeability through poorly understood mechanisms and was associated with systemic side effects. Agents that target the VEGF signaling pathways, such as cediranib, have been promising in prolonging survival in rat models but associated with local and systemic side effects as well.

== Diagnosis ==
Cerebral edema is commonly present in a variety of neurological injuries. Thus, determining a definitive contribution of cerebral edema to the neurological status of an affected person can be challenging. Close bedside monitoring of a person's level of consciousness and awareness of any new or worsening focal neurological deficits is imperative but demanding, frequently requiring admission into the intensive care unit (ICU).

Cerebral edema with sustained increased intracranial hypertension and brain herniation can signify impending catastrophic neurological events which require immediate recognition and treatment to prevent injury and even death. Therefore, diagnosis of cerebral edema earlier with rapid intervention can improve clinical outcomes and can mortality, or risk of death.

Diagnosis of cerebral edema relies on the following:

=== Imaging ===
Serial neuroimaging (CT scans and magnetic resonance imaging) can be useful in diagnosing or excluding intracranial hemorrhage, large masses, acute hydrocephalus, or brain herniation as well as providing information on the type of edema present and the extent of affected area. CT scan is the imaging modality of choice as it is widely available, quick, and with minimal risks. However, CT scan can be limited in determining the exact cause of cerebral edema in which cases, CT angiography (CTA), MRI, or digital subtraction angiography (DSA) may be necessary. MRI is particularly useful as it can differentiate between cytotoxic and vasogenic edema, guiding future treatment decisions.

=== Intracranial pressure monitoring ===
Intracranial pressure (ICP) and its management is a fundamental concept in traumatic brain injury (TBI). The Brain Trauma Foundation guidelines recommend ICP monitoring in individuals with TBI that have decreased Glasgow Coma Scale (GCS) scores, abnormal CT scans, or additional risk factors such as older age and elevated blood pressure. However, no such guidelines exist for ICP monitoring in other brain injuries such as ischemic stroke, intracerebral hemorrhage, cerebral neoplasm.

Clinical researches have recommended ICP and cerebral perfusion pressure (CPP) monitoring in any persons with cerebral injury who are at risk of elevated intracranial pressure based on clinical and neuroimaging features. Early monitoring can be used to guide medical and surgical decision making and to detect potentially life-threatening brain herniation. There was however, conflicting evidence on the threshold values of ICP that indicated the need for intervention. Researchers also recommend that medical decisions should be tailored to the specific diagnosis (e.g. subarachnoid hemorrhage, TBI, encephalitis) and that ICP elevation should be used in conjunction with clinical and neuroimaging and not as an isolated prognostic marker.

== Treatment ==
The primary goal in cerebral edema is to optimize and regulate cerebral perfusion, oxygenation, and venous drainage, decrease cerebral metabolic demands, and to stabilize the osmolality pressure gradient between the brain and the surrounding vasculature. As cerebral edema is linked to increased intracranial pressure (ICP), many of the therapies will focus on ICP.

=== General measures for managing cerebral edema ===
==== Positioning ====
Finding the optimal head position in persons with cerebral edema is necessary to avoid compression of the jugular vein and obstruction of venous outflow from the skull, and for decreasing cerebrospinal fluid hydrostatic pressure. The current recommendation is to elevate the head of the bed to 30 degrees to optimize cerebral perfusion pressure and control the increase in intracranial pressure. It is also worth noting that measures should be taken to reduce restrictive neck dressings or garments as these may lead to compression of the internal jugular veins and reduce venous outflow.

==== Ventilation and oxygenation ====
Decreased oxygen concentration in the blood, hypoxia, and increase in the carbon dioxide concentration in the blood, hypercapnia, are potent vasodilators in the cerebral vasculature, and should be avoided in those with cerebral edema. It is recommended that persons with decreased levels of consciousness be intubated for airway protection and maintenance of oxygen and carbon dioxide levels. However, the laryngeal instrumentation involved in the intubation process is associated with an acute, brief rise in intracranial pressure. Pretreatment with a sedative agent and neuromuscular blocking agent to induce unconsciousness and motor paralysis has been recommended as part of standard Rapid Sequence Intubation (RSI). Intravenous lidocaine prior to RSI has been suggested to reduce the rise in ICP but there is no supporting data at this time.

Additionally, ventilation with use of positive pressure (PEEP) can improve oxygenation with the negative effect of decreasing cerebral venous drainage and increasing intracranial pressure (ICP), and thus, must be used with caution.

==== Fluid management and cerebral perfusion ====
Maintenance of cerebral perfusion pressure using appropriate fluid management is essential in patients with brain injury. Dehydration, or intravascular volume loss, and the use of hypotonic fluids, such as D5W or half normal saline, should be avoided. Blood serum ion concentration, or osmolality, should be maintained in the normo to hyperosmolar range. Judicial use of hypertonic saline can be used to increase serum osmolality and decrease cerebral edema, as discussed below.

Blood pressure should be sufficient so as to sustain cerebral perfusion pressures greater than 60 mm Hg for optimal blood blow to the brain. Vasopressors may be used to achieve adequate blood pressures with minimal risk of increasing intracranial pressures. However, sharp rises in blood pressure should be avoided. Maximum blood pressures tolerated are variable and controversial depending on the clinical situation.

==== Seizure prophylaxis ====
Seizures, including subclinical seizure activity, can complicate clinical courses and increase progression of brain herniation in persons with cerebral edema and increased intracranial pressure. Anticonvulsants can be used to treat seizures caused by acute brain injuries from a variety of origins. However, there are no clear guidelines on the use of anticonvulsants for prophylactic use. Their use may be warranted on depending on the clinical scenario and studies have shown that anticonvulsants such as phenytoin can be given prophylactically without a significant increase in drug-related side effects.

==== Fever ====
Fever has been demonstrated to increase metabolism and oxygen demand in the brain. The increased metabolic demand results in an increase in cerebral blood flow and can increase the intracranial pressure within the skull. Therefore, maintaining a stable body temperature within the normal range is strongly recommended. This can be achieved through the use of antipyretics such as acetaminophen (paracetamol) and cooling the body, as described below.

==== Hyperglycemia ====
Elevated blood glucose levels, known as hyperglycemia, can exacerbate brain injury and cerebral edema and has been associated with worse clinical outcomes in persons affected by traumatic brain injuries, subarachnoid hemorrhages, and ischemic strokes.

==== Sedation ====
Pain and agitation can worsen cerebral edema, acutely increase intracranial pressure (ICP), and should be controlled. Careful use of pain medication such as morphine or fentanyl can be used for analgesia. For those persons with decreased levels of consciousness, sedation is necessary for endotracheal intubation and maintenance of a secure airway. Sedative medication used in the intubation process, specifically propofol, have been shown to control ICP, decrease cerebral metabolic demand, and have antiseizure properties. Due to a short half-life, propofol, is a quick-acting medication whose administration and removal is well tolerated, with hypotension being the limiting factor in its continued use. Additionally, the use of nondepolarizing neuromusclar blocking agents (NMBA), such as doxacurium or atracurium, have been indicated to facilitate ventilation and manage brain injuries but there are no controlled studies on the use of NMBAs in the management of increased intracranial pressure. Depolarizing neuromuscular blocking agents, most notably succinylcholine, can worsen increased ICP due to induction of muscle contraction within the body.

==== Nutrition ====
Nutritional support is necessary in all patients with acute brain injury. Enteral feeding, or through mouth via tube, is the preferred method, unless contraindicated. Additional attention must be placed on the solute concentration of the formulations to avoid free water intake, decreased serum osmolality, and worsening of the cerebral edema.

Elevated blood glucose, or hyperglycemia, is associated with increased edema in patients with cerebral ischemia and increases the risk of a hemorrhagic transformation of ischemic stroke. Maintaining a normal blood glucose level of less than 180 mg/dL is suggested. However, tight glycemic control of blood glucose under 126 mg/dL is associated with worsening of stroke size.

=== Specific measures ===
Although cerebral edema is closely related to increased intracranial pressure (ICP) and cerebral herniation and the general treatment strategies above are useful, the treatment should ultimately be tailored to the primary cause of the symptoms. The management of individual diseases are discussed separately.

The following interventions are more specific treatments for managing cerebral edema and increased ICP:

==== Osmotic therapy ====
The goal of osmotic therapy is to create a higher concentration of ions within the vasculature at the blood–brain barrier. This will create an osmotic pressure gradient and will cause the flow of water out of the brain and into the vasculature for drainage elsewhere. An ideal osmotic agent produces a favorable osmotic pressure gradient, is nontoxic, and is not filtered out by the blood–brain barrier. Hypertonic saline and mannitol are the main osmotic agents in use, while loop diuretics can aid in the removal of the excess fluid pulled out of the brain.

- Hypertonic saline is a highly concentrated solution of sodium chloride in water and is administered intravenously. It has a rapid-onset, with reduction of pressures within 5 minutes of infusion, lasting up to 12 hours in some cases, and with negligible rebound pressure. The exact volume and concentration of the hypertonic saline varies between clinical studies. Bolus doses, particularly at higher concentrations, for example 23.4%, are effective at reducing ICP and improving cerebral perfusion pressure. In traumatic brain injuries, a responsiveness to hypertonic saline lasting greater than 2 hours was associated with decreased chance of death and improved neurologic outcomes. The effects of hypertonic saline can be prolonged with combination to agents such as dextran or hydroxyethyl starch, although their use is currently controversial. When compared to mannitol, hypertonic saline has been shown to be as effective as mannitol in decreased ICP in neurocritical care and is more effective in many cases. Hypertonic saline may be preferable to mannitol in persons with hypovolemia or hyponatremia.
- Mannitol is an alcohol derivative of simple sugar mannose, and is historically the most commonly used osmotic diuretic. Mannitol acts as an inert solute in the blood, decreasing ICP through osmosis as discussed above. Additionally, mannitol decreases ICP and increased cerebral perfusion pressure by increasing reabsorption of cerebrospinal fluid, dilutes and decreased the viscosity of the blood, and can cause cerebral vasoconstriction. Furthermore, mannitol acts in a dose-dependent manner and will not lower ICP if it is not elevated. However, the common limitation of the use of mannitol is its tendency to cause low blood pressure hypotension. Compared to hypertonic saline, mannitol may be more effective at increasing cerebral perfusion pressures and may be preferable in those with hypoperfusion.
- Loop diuretics, commonly furosemide, act within the kidneys to increase excretion of water and solutes. Combination with mannitol produces a profound diuresis and increases the risk of systemic dehydration and hypotension. Their use remains controversial.
- Acetazolamide, a carbonic anhydrase inhibitor, acts as a weak diuretic and modulates CSF production but has not role in the management of cerebral edema from acute brain injuries. It can be used in the outpatient management of cerebral edema caused by idiopathic intracranial hypertension (pseudotumor cerebri).

==== Glucocorticoids ====
Glucocorticoids, such as dexamethasone, have been shown to decrease tight-junction permeability and stabilize the blood-brain barrier. Their main use has been in the management of vasogenic cerebral edema associated with brain tumors, brain irradiation, and surgical manipulation. Glucocorticoids have not been shown to have any benefit in ischemic stroke and have been found to be harmful in traumatic brain injury. Due to the negative side effects (such as peptic ulcers, hyperglycemia, and impairment of wound healing), steroid use should be restricted to cases where they are absolutely indicated.

==== Hyperventilation ====
As mentioned previously, hypoxia and hypercapnia are potent vasodilators in the cerebral vasculature, leading to increased cerebral blood flow (CBF) and worsening of cerebral edema. Conversely, therapeutic hyperventilation can be used to lower the carbon dioxide content in the blood and reduce ICP through vasoconstriction. The effects of hyperventilation, although effective, are short-lived and once removed, can often lead to a rebound elevation of ICP. Furthermore, overaggressive hyperventilation and vasoconstriction and lead to severe reduction in CBF and cause cerebral ischemia, or strokes. As a result, standard practice is to slowly reverse hyperventilation while more definitive treatments aimed at the primary cause are instituted.

Prolonged hyperventilation in those with traumatic brain injuries has been shown to worsen outcomes.

==== Barbiturates ====
Induction of a coma via the use of barbiturates, most notably pentobarbital and thiopental, after brain injury is used for secondary treatment of refractory ICP. Yet their use is not without controversy and it is not clear whether barbiturates are favored over surgical decompression. In patients with traumatic brain injuries, barbiturates are effective in reducing ICP but have failed to show benefit to clinical outcomes. Evidence is limited for their use in cerebral disease that include tumor, intracranial hypertension, and ischemic stroke. There are several adverse effects of barbiturates that limit their use, such as lowering of systemic blood pressure and cerebral perfusion pressure, cardiodepression, immunosuppression, and systemic hypothermia.

==== Hypothermia ====
As discussed previously in the treatment of fever, temperature control has been shown to decrease metabolic demand and reduce further ischemic injury. In traumatic brain injury, induced hypothermia may reduce the risks of mortality, poor neurologic outcome in adults. However, outcomes varied greatly with depth and duration of hypothermia as well as rewarming procedures. In children with traumatic brain injury, there was no benefit to therapeutic hypothermia and increased the risk of mortality and arrhythmia. The adverse effects of hypothermia are serious and require clinical monitoring including increased chance of infection, coagulopathy, and electrolyte derangement. The current consensus is that adverse effects outweigh the benefits and its use restricted to clinical trials and refractory increased ICP to other therapies.

==== Surgery ====
The Monroe–Kellie doctrine states that the skull is a fixed and inelastic space and the accumulation of edema will compress vital brain tissue and blood vessels. Surgical treatment of cerebral edema in the context of cerebellar or cerebral infarction is typically done by removing part of the skull to allow expansion of the dura. This will help to reduce the volume constraints inside of the skull. A decompressive hemicraniectomy is the most commonly used procedure. Multiple randomized clinical trials have shown reduced risk of death with hemicraniectomy compared with medical management. However, no individual study has shown an improvement in the percentage of survivors with good functional outcomes.

Timing of decompressive craniectomy remains controversial, but is generally suggested that the surgery is best performed before there are clinical signs of brainstem compression. Postoperative complications include wound dehiscence, hydrocephalus, infection, and a substantial proportion of patients may also require tracheostomy and gastrotomy in the early phase after surgery.

== Outcomes ==
Cerebral edema is a severe complication of acute brain injuries, most notably ischemic stroke and traumatic brain injuries, and a significant cause of morbidity and mortality.

- Cerebral edema is the cause of death in 5% of all patients with cerebral infarction and mortality after large ischemic strokes with cerebral edema is roughly 20 to 30% despite medical and surgical interventions. Cerebral edema usually occurs between the second and fifth day after onset of symptoms. Large territory ischemic strokes can lead to the rapid development of malignant brain edema and increased intracranial pressure. Cerebral edema in the context of a malignant middle cerebral artery (MCA) infarct has a mortality of 50 to 80% if treated conservatively. Individuals with cerebral edema had a worse 3-month functional outcome than those without edema. These effects were more pronounced with increasing extent of cerebral edema and were independent of the size of the infarct.
- Mild traumatic brain injury (TBI) represents 70–90% of all reported head injuries. The presence of brain edema on the initial CT scan of those with traumatic brain injuries is an independent prognostic indicator of in-hospital death. The association of brain edema with increased in hospital risk of death was observed in TBI across all level of severity. Edema in the acute and chronic phases were associated with a worse neurologic and clinical outcome. Children with TBI and cerebral edema have worse clinical outcomes as well.

== Epidemiology ==
As cerebral edema is present with many common cerebral pathologies, the epidemiology of the disease is not easily defined. The incidence of this disorder should be considered in terms of its potential causes and is present in most cases of traumatic brain injury, central nervous system tumors, brain ischemia, and intracerebral hemorrhage.

- In one study, cerebral edema was found in 28% of those individuals with thrombolysis-treated ischemic strokes, 10% of which occurred in severe forms. A further study detected cerebral edema in 22.7% of cerebral ischemic strokes. A meta-analysis of current studies showed that 31% of those affected by ischemic strokes developed cerebral edema in 31% of cases.
- In traumatic brain injuries, cerebral edema occurred in greater than 60% of those with mass lesions, and in 15% of those with initial normal CT scans.

== Research ==
The current understanding of the pathophysiology of cerebral edema after traumatic brain injury or intracerebral hemorrhage is incomplete. Current treatment therapies aimed at cerebral edema and increased intracranial pressure are effective at reducing intracranial hypertension but have unclear impacts on functional outcomes. Additionally, cerebral and ICP treatments have varied effects on individuals based on differing characteristics like age, gender, type of injury, and genetics. There are innumerable molecular pathways that contribute to cerebral edema, many of which have yet to be discovered. Researchers argue that the future treatment of cerebral edema will be based on advances in identifying the underlying pathophysiology and molecular characteristics of cerebral edema in a variety of cases. At the same time, improvement of radiographic markers, biomarkers, and analysis of clinical monitoring data is essential in treating cerebral edema.

Many studies of the mechanical properties of brain edema were conducted in the 2010s, most of them based on finite element analysis (FEA), a widely used numerical method in solid mechanics. For example, Gao and Ang used the finite element method to study changes in intracranial pressure during craniotomy operations. A second line of research on the condition looks at thermal conductivity, which is related to tissue water content.

== See also ==
- Intracranial pressure
- Edema
- Amyloid-related imaging abnormalities
- Bruce Lee
