= Superficial siderosis =

- Other names: Superficial siderosis of the CNS, Superficial hemosiderosis of the CNS, Superficial hemosiderosis of the central nervous system

Superficial hemosiderosis of the central nervous system is a disease of the brain resulting from chronic iron deposition in neuronal tissues associated with cerebrospinal fluid. This occurs via the deposition of hemosiderin in neuronal tissue, and is associated with neuronal loss, gliosis, and demyelination of neuronal cells. This disease was first discovered in 1908 by R.C. Hamill after performing an autopsy. Detection of this disease was largely post-mortem until the advent of MRI technology, which made diagnosis far easier. Superficial siderosis is largely considered a rare disease, with fewer than 270 total reported cases in scientific literature as of 2006, and affects people of a wide range of ages with men being approximately three times more frequently affected than women. The number of reported cases of superficial siderosis has increased with advances in MRI technology, but it remains a rare disease.

== Symptoms and signs ==
Superficial siderosis is characterized by many symptoms resulting from brain damage:

- Sensorineural hearing loss- This is the most common symptom associated with superficial siderosis and its absence is rare. The highest pitches are often lost first, and over a period of one to twelve years hearing loss progresses to total deafness or loss of all hearing but low pitches.
- Ataxia- The impairment of gait, which is the second most common symptom.
- Pyramidal signs- Various signs that indicate a condition of the pyramidal tracts.
- Dementia- Occurs in approximately one-quarter of those affected by superficial siderosis.
- Disturbances of the bladder
- Anosmia- Loss of sense of smell.
- Anisocoria- Unequal size of pupils.

== Cause ==
The most commonly described underlying cause of superficial siderosis is chronic bleeding into the subarachnoid space of the brain, which releases erythrocytes, or blood cells, into the cerebrospinal fluid. The chronic bleeding can come from many sources such as from an arteriovenous malformation or cavernous malformation, myxopapillary ependymoma of the spinal cord, from chronic subdural hematoma, from a ventricular shunt, spinal CSF leak, or from chronic subarachnoid hemorrhage. Chronic bleeding sources can also be a result of past brain surgery or CNS trauma, which may be the most common cause of superficial siderosis, with superficial siderosis showing up many years later. In up to as many as half of all described cases the source of bleeding was never found.

== Pathology ==
Blood cells are not native to the cerebrospinal fluid, and their presence there is problematic. Once they eventually break down, they release the heme containing protein hemoglobin. Hemoglobin breaks down and releases iron-containing heme into the cerebrospinal fluid. In response to this upsurge in heme levels, Bergmann glia and microglia produce heme oxygenase 1. Heme oxygenase 1 breaks down free heme into biliverdin, carbon monoxide, and iron. It is this breakdown of heme that is the source of iron deposition that ultimately causes superficial siderosis. The excess free iron is circulated in the cerebrospinal fluid and deposited in neuronal tissues, where it catalyzes the formation of reactive oxygen species which can damage DNA, lipids and proteins, and is otherwise toxic to the cells.

Iron deposition is prevalent in siderotic brain tissues, with iron concentrations of 1.79 to 8.26 times normal levels. Ferritin, an iron storage protein, is over-produced in response to excess heme by glial cells in order to sequester iron, with production ranging from 20.1 to 27.4 times normal levels. Excess iron, ferritin, and red blood cells may result in xanthochromia of the cerebrospinal fluid. Amongst neuronal cells types, iron deposition appears to be preferential for oligodendroglial cells, which is supported by the belief that they can act as iron sinks in the central nervous system. Schwann cells are also frequently damaged, contributing to demyelination.

Iron deposition is most prevalent in the inferior temporal lobes, the brainstem, the cerebellum, peri-ventricular structures, the spinal cord, and cranial nerve VIII. Iron deposition is also present in cranial nerves I & II, but this damage less frequently presents symptoms when compared to cranial nerve VIII, which can be explained by cranial nerve VIII's notable segment of glial cells, which are preferentially affected by iron deposition.

The presence of 'foamy', 'spheroid', or 'cytoid' bodies in affected neuronal tissues has been noted but what they are and their origin remains somewhat unclear. They are believed to be swollen axonal bodies, but some evidence exists that they may be astrocytic in origin.

== Diagnosis ==
MRI showing pulsations of CSF (normal individual)

Early detection of superficial siderosis is usually via MRI. The iron deposition that is characteristic of superficial siderosis shows up as a hypointense band in affected tissues, with a characteristic rim of intensity appearing on the cerebellum; a hyperintense rim is rarely seen. Taking samples of cerebrospinal fluid may also reveal siderosis through xanthochromia, elevated presence of red blood cells, high iron and ferritin concentrations, and elevated levels of the proteins Tau, amyloid beta (Aβ42), neurofilament light chain (NFL), and glial fibrillary acidic protein (GFAP), but the CSF is sometimes normal. Detection is complicated by the fact that superficial siderosis is a rare disease and is not well described in neurological texts, so it may go unnoticed until noticeable symptoms appear.

== Treatment ==
There is no current cure for superficial siderosis, only treatments to help alleviate the current symptoms and to help prevent the development of further symptoms. If a source of bleeding can be identified (sources are frequently not found), then surgical correction of the bleeding source can be performed; this has proved to be effective in halting the development of further symptoms in some cases and has no effect on symptoms that have already presented. Patients with superficial siderosis are often treated with deferiprone (brand name is Ferriprox), a lipid-soluble iron chelator, as this medication has been demonstrated to chelate iron in the central nervous system. Deferiprone use is associated with severe neutropenia, but this risk and associated complications are usually minimised by administering a weekly blood test that measures absolute neutrophil count.

Alleviation of the most common symptom, hearing loss, has been varyingly successful through the use of cochlear implants. Most people do not notice a large improvement after successful implantation, which is most likely due to damage to the vestibulocochlear nerve (cranial nerve VIII) and not the cochlea itself. Some people fare far better, with a return to near-normal hearing, but there is little ability to detect how well a person will respond to this treatment at this time.

A 2025 case report described successful use of electroconvulsive therapy (ECT) for refractory panic attacks and depression in a patient with superficial siderosis, with marked improvement after eight bifrontal treatments.
