= Bapineuzumab =

Chemical compound

Monoclonal antibody
- Type: Whole antibody
- Source: Humanized (from mouse)
- Target: beta-amyloid (Aβ)

Clinical data
- ATC code: none

Identifiers
- CAS Number: 648895-38-9
- ChemSpider: none
- UNII: NC11WKO35D
- ECHA InfoCard: 100.133.214

Chemical and physical data
- Formula: C_{6466}H_{10018}N_{1734}O_{2026}S_{44}
- Molar mass: 145874.02 g·mol^{−1}

Bapineuzumab (nicknamed "bapi") is a humanized monoclonal antibody that acts on the nervous system and may have potential therapeutic value for the treatment of Alzheimer's disease and possibly glaucoma. However, in 2012 it failed to produce significant cognitive improvements in patients in two major trials, despite lowering key biomarkers of AD, amyloid brain plaque and hyperphosphorylated tau protein in CSF.

Bapineuzumab has been shown to recognise the extreme N-terminal 5 residues of Aβ peptide in a helical conformation (4HIX.pdb) stabilized by internal hydrogen bonds involving the first three amino acids.

Bapineuzumab is an antibody to the beta-amyloid (Aβ) plaques that are believed to underlie Alzheimer's disease neuropathology. In previous clinical trials for vaccination against human beta amyloid, called AN-1792, patients with Alzheimer's disease using active immunization had positive outcomes with removal of plaques, but 6% of subjects developed aseptic meningitis and the trial was stopped.

== Testing ==
Bapineuzumab was being co-developed by the pharmaceutical companies Élan and Wyeth and entered Phase III trials in December 2007. In 2008 a Johnson & Johnson affiliate acquired a substantial portion of Élan's assets related to the Alzheimer's immunotherapy program, which Elan had shared with Wyeth. The program is continuing with Pfizer, which acquired Wyeth in 2009.

Bapineuzumab was the first antibody to be found to cause amyloid-related imaging abnormalities, including an accumulation of fluid in brain tissue (ARIA-E) in patients receiving the highest dose. No health risks were found in subjects receiving either 0.5 or 1 mg of bapineuzumab. Patients who have been receiving or have been scheduled to receive the highest dose will be either removed from the trials or switched to lower doses.

The efficacy of drugs targeted to brain plaques in Alzheimer's patients has been called into question, although such drugs may still be effective for prophylaxis if given to individuals who have not yet developed clinical symptoms.

On August 6, 2012, Pfizer Inc. and Johnson & Johnson said they are ending development of an intravenous formulation of bapineuzumab. Testing showed the drug did not work better than placebo in two late-stage trials in patients who had mild to moderate Alzheimer's disease.

Élan announced that Johnson & Johnson, on July 16, 2013, had discontinued Phase 2 testing of the subcutaneous formulation of bapineuzumab.

== Insider trading ==
Mathew Martoma, formerly of S.A.C. Capital Advisors, was convicted in February 2014 of insider trading on news passed by neurologist Sid Gilman of the cancellation of bapineuzumab's testing.
