= Semorinemab =

Anti-tau monoclonal antibody

Monoclonal antibody
- Type: ?

Clinical data
- Other names: MTAU-9937A; MTAU9937A; RG-6100; RG6100; RO-7105705; RO7105705

Identifiers
- CAS Number: 2159141-27-0
- DrugBank: DB15234
- UNII: O8DG8VI95O
- KEGG: D11687
- ChEMBL: ChEMBL4298093

Semorinemab (INN, USAN; developmental code names MTAU-9937A, RG-6100, RO-7105705) is a monoclonal antibody against tau which was under development for the treatment of Alzheimer's disease but was discontinued. It binds to the N-terminus of all six isoforms of tau. The drug was ineffective in the treatment of Alzheimer's disease in two phase 2 clinical trials. Clinical development of semorinemab for Alzheimer's disease was discontinued in February 2024.
