= Eisai (company) =

Japanese pharmaceutical company

Eisai Co., Ltd.

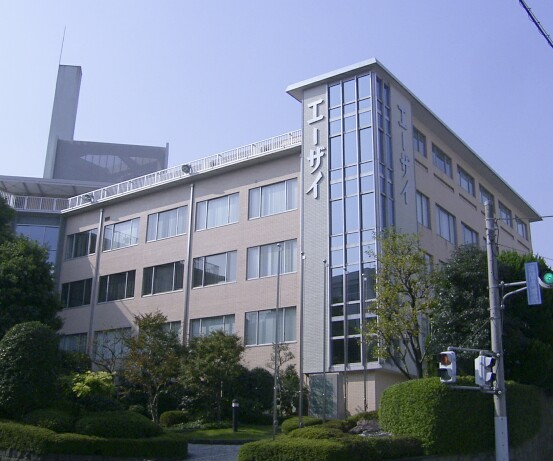
- Native name: エーザイ株式会社
- Romanized name: Ēzai kabushiki gaisha
- Type: Public KK
- Traded as: TYO: 4523; TOPIX Large 70 Component; TOPIX 100 Component; Nikkei 225 Component
- Industry: Pharmaceuticals
- Founded: December 6, 1941; 84 years ago
- Founder: Toyoji Naito
- Headquarters: 4-6-10 Koishikawa, Bunkyo-ku, Tokyo 112-8088, Japan
- Key people: Haruo Naito (President and CEO)
- Products: Lecanemab; Lenvema; Halaven; Aricept; Pariet; Banzel; Zonegran; Fycompa; Zebinix
- Revenue: ▲¥ 741.8 billion (2023)
- Operating income: ▲¥ 53.4 billion (2023)
- Net income: ▲¥ 43.8 billion (2023)
- Total assets: ▲¥ 743.9 billion (2023)
- Total equity: ▲¥ 430.2 billion (2023)
- Owner: The Master Trust Bank of Japan (11.78%); Japan Trustee Services Bank (10.99%); Nippon Life (4.29%)
- Number of employees: ▲10,000 (2023)
- Website: Official website

Eisai Co., Ltd. (Japanese: エーザイ株式会社, Hepburn: Ēzai Kabushiki-gaisha) is a Japanese pharmaceutical company headquartered in Tokyo, Japan. It has some 10,000 employees, among them about 1,500 in research. Eisai is listed on the Tokyo Stock Exchange and is a member of the Topix 100 and Nikkei 225 stock indices.

== History ==
Nihon Eisai Co. Ltd. was established in 1941. In 1944, merger with Sakuragaoka Research Laboratory resulted in creation of Eisai Co. Ltd. The American subsidiary of the company, Eisai Inc., was established in 1995.

On November 25, 1996, Eisai received approval from the United States Food and Drug Administration (USFDA) for Aricept (donepezil), a drug discovered in the company's labs and co-marketed with Pfizer.

Three years later in 1999, the company received USFDA approval for Aciphex (rabeprazole), a drug co-marketed with Johnson & Johnson.

In September 2006, the company acquired four oncology products from Ligand Pharmaceuticals.

In April 2007, Eisai acquired Exton, Pennsylvania-based Morphotek, a company developing therapeutic monoclonal antibodies for the treatment of cancer, rheumatoid arthritis, and infectious diseases.

In December 2007, Eisai acquired MGI Pharma, a company specializing in oncology, for US$3.9 billion. This event brought Dacogen (decitabine), Aloxi (palonosetron), Hexalen (altretamine) for ovarian cancer, and the Gliadel Wafer (carmustine) for brain tumors into the Eisai product portfolio.

In 2009, Eisai received the Corporate Award from the National Organization for Rare Disorders (NORD) for the development of Banzel (rufinamide).

In 2010, Eisai's Halaven (eribulin mesylate) was approved for advanced or metastatic breast cancer in the United States, with approvals in the European Union (EU), Japan and Canada following in 2011.

In June 2023, the company suffered from a ransomware attack, causing a shutdown of some of its logistical systems.

Lecanemab, branded as "Leqembi" was approved by the U.S. Food and Drug Administration (FDA) in January 2023 under an Accelerated Approval pathway. The approval was converted into a traditional approval in July 2023.

== Locations ==
Eisai Co., Ltd. is based in Tokyo, Japan, while its American subsidiary, Eisai Inc., is headquartered in Nutley, New Jersey. Eisai Inc. is led by Ivan Cheung as CEO. Eisai maintains medical research headquarters in Nutley as well as at locations in Japan, the United Kingdom, the Research Triangle in North Carolina, and Massachusetts where the Eisai Research Institute and the Genetics Guided Dementia Discovery (G2D2) institute are based.

The company has manufacturing sites in Japan, North Carolina (USA), Maryland (USA), Bogor (Indonesia), Suzhou (China), Tainan (Taiwan), Visakhapatnam (India) and Hatfield, Hertfordshire (UK). Eisai has marketing operations in 19 European countries as well as the Asia-Pacific region.

== Products ==
Some of the key products that Eisai produces or markets with partners include:

- Aciphex/Pariet (rabeprazole) - Gastroesophageal reflux disease
- Actonel (risedronic acid) - Osteoporosis (Japan)
- Aloxi (palonosetron) - Chemotherapy-induced nausea and vomiting
- Aricept (donepezil) - Mild to moderate dementia for Alzheimer's Disease patients
- Banzel/Inovelon (rufinamide) - Seizures related to Lennox-Gastaut Syndrome
- Belviq (lorcaserin) - Obesity
- Dayvigo (lemborexant) - Insomnia
- Fragmin (dalteparin) - Deep vein thrombosis and pulmonary embolism
- Fycompa (perampanel) - Partial-onset seizures
- Gliadel Wafer (carmustine) - Treatment for Brain Tumors
- Halaven (eribulin) - Metastatic breast cancer
- Iomeron (iomeprol) - Non-ionic contrast medium
- Lenvima (lenvatinib) - Thyroid Cancer or Kidney Cancer
- Leqembi (lecanemab) - Alzheimer's disease
- Methylcobal (methylcobalamin) - Peripheral neuropathy
- Myonal (eperisone) - Muscle relaxant
- Selbex (teprenone) - Gastric ulcers and gastritis
- Zonegran (zonisamide) - Partial-onset seizures

=== Aricept ===
Aricept accounted for 40% of Eisai's revenue as of March 2010. The main competitor to Aricept is a generic formulation from Ranbaxy Labs. Eisai has pursued development of alternative formulations in order to extend the marketable lifetime of the product.

== See also ==
- Biotech and pharmaceutical companies in the New York metropolitan area
