= Amyloid-related imaging abnormalities =

- Other names: ARIA
- Two MRI scans demonstrating the difference between ARIA-E (left) and ARIA-H in the parietal region (right)
- Specialty: Radiology, neurology

Amyloid-related imaging abnormalities (ARIA) are abnormal differences seen in magnetic resonance imaging of the brain in patients with Alzheimer's disease. ARIA is associated with anti-amyloid drugs, particularly human monoclonal antibodies such as aducanumab. There are two types of ARIA: ARIA-E and ARIA-H. The phenomenon was first seen in trials of bapineuzumab.

== ARIA-E ==
ARIA-E refers to cerebral edema, involving the breakdown of the tight endothelial junctions of the blood-brain barrier and subsequent accumulation of fluid. In a double-blind trial of the humanised monoclonal antibody solanezumab (n = 2042), sixteen patients (11 taking the drug, 5 taking a placebo), or 0.78% developed ARIA-E. A further 7 patients developed ARIA-E during an open-label extension of the trial.

The effect of ARIA-E depends on the severity and location of the edema. Symptoms may include headache, changes in mental state, confusion, vomiting, nausea, tremor and gait disturbances.

== ARIA-H ==
ARIA-H refers to cerebral microhaemorrhages (mH), small haemorrhages on the brain, often accompanied by hemosiderosis. mH are usually seen as small, round and low intensity lesions and are small haemosiderin deposits. Some studies define mH as being less than or equal to 10mm, while others define the cut-off as ≤ 5mm. The prevalence of mH in healthy elderly people is approximately 6%, but this value increases to between 50% and 80% in elderly people with cerebrovascular disease.

== Mechanism of action ==
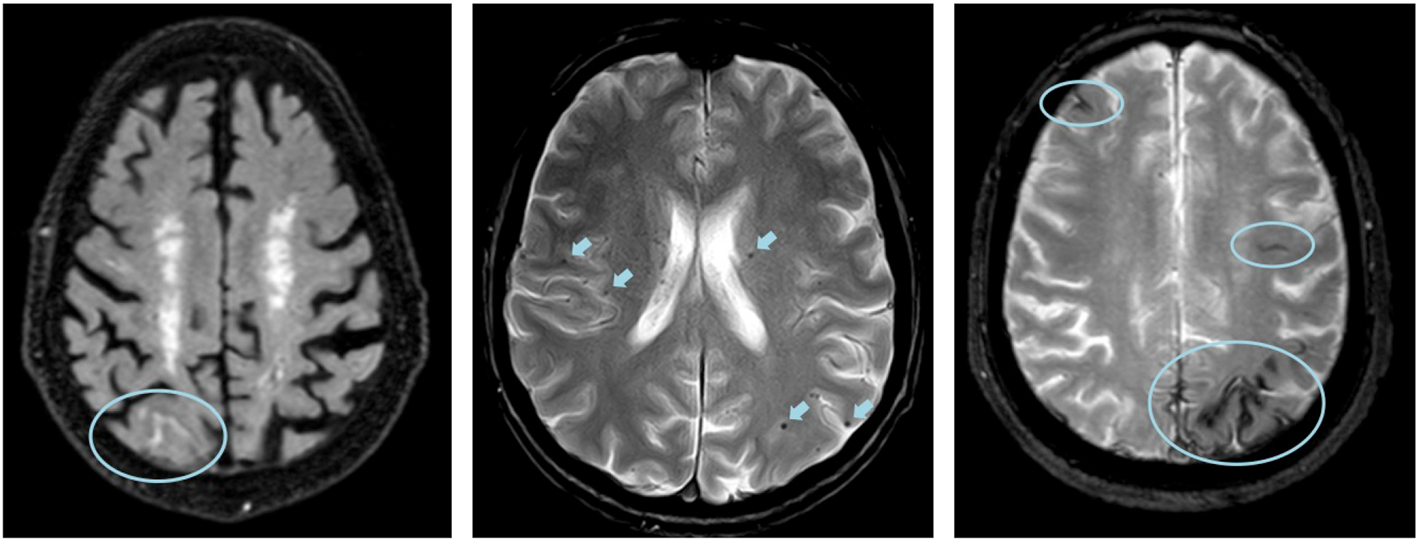
MRI scans of the human brain, examples of ARIA highlighted in blue: Left: ARIA-E with sulcal effusion (FLAIR sequence) Middle: ARIA-H with multiple microbleeds (T2* weighted) Right: ARIA-H with superficial siderosis (T2* weighted)

Two non-exclusive mechanisms have been postulated. Firstly, in the context of aging and neurodegeneration, the integrity of the blood-brain barrier (BBB) can become compromised, resulting in increased permeability. Notably, amyloid plaques have been hypothesized to counteract this BBB leakage. However, upon the administration of antibodies, these plaques are targeted and subsequently eliminated, potentially uncovering the occurrence of micro-hemorrhage Secondly, an alternate perspective posits that the introduction of antibodies into the bloodstream triggers an immune-inflammatory response as part of the treatment regimen. This orchestrated immune reaction might inadvertently precipitate micro-hemorrhages.

== ARIA MRI Classification Criteria ==
ARIA MRI Classification Criteria
| ARIA Type | Radiographic Severity | | |
| ARIA Type | Mild | Moderate | Severe |
|---|---|---|---|
| ARIA-E Edema | FLAIR hyperintensity confined to sulcus and/or cortex/subcortical white matter in one location < 5 cm | FLAIR hyperintensity 5 to 10 cm, or more than 1 site of involvement, each measuring < 10 cm | FLAIR hyperintensity measuring > 10 cm, often with significant subcortical white matter and/or sulcal involvement. One or more separate sites of involvement may be noted. |
| ARIA-H microHemorrhage | ≤ 4 new incident microhemorrhages | 5 to 9 new incident microhemorrhages | 10 or more new incident microhemorrhages |
| ARIA-H superficial siderosis (Hemosiderin) | 1 focal area of superficial siderosis | 2 focal areas of superficial siderosis | > 2 focal areas of superficial siderosis |
