= Confirmatory trial =

Type of clinical trial

A confirmatory trial is an adequately controlled trial where hypotheses are stated in advance and evaluated according to a protocol. This type of trial may be implemented when it is necessary to provide additional or firm evidence of efficacy or safety.

The mechanism of the trial implements a key hypothesis of interest which is rigorously tested at the end of the confirmatory trial and directly follows the predefined primary objective of the trial. Of importance in a confirmatory trial is the process of estimating with due precision potential effects attributable to the treatment, the quantity of effects and relating these effects to their clinical significance.

According to the International Conference on Harmonisation of Technical Requirements for Registration of Pharmaceuticals for Human Use: "Confirmatory Trials are intended to provide firm evidence in support of claims and hence adherence to protocols and standard operating procedures is particularly important; unavoidable changes should be explained and documented, and their effect examined."

Basic outline of the process of a confirmatory trial

1. A design justification and statistical aspects such as the principal features of the planned analysis, is established as part of the initial protocol.
2. The confirmatory trial should be concise in addressing only a specific number of questions.
3. The confirmatory trial should clarify key clinical questions relevant to efficacy and/or safety clearly and definitively.
4. The target patient population segmented for the trial is clearly outlined, understood and defined as this may influence the test sites and scientists (practitioners, specialists, etc.) involved.
