= Solanezumab =

Monoclonal antibody medication

Monoclonal antibody
- Type: Whole antibody
- Source: Humanized
- Target: Beta amyloid

Clinical data
- ATC code: none

Legal status
- Legal status: Investigational

Identifiers
- CAS Number: 955085-14-0
- ChemSpider: none
- UNII: 5D6PWO0333
- KEGG: D10058

Chemical and physical data
- Formula: C_{6396}H_{9922}N_{1712}O_{1996}S_{42}
- Molar mass: 144084.24 g·mol^{−1}

Solanezumab (proposed INN, LY2062430) is a monoclonal antibody being investigated by Eli Lilly as a neuroprotector for patients with Alzheimer's disease. The drug originally attracted extensive media coverage proclaiming it a breakthrough, but it has failed to show promise in Phase III trials.

== Medical uses ==
Solanezumab was safely used in combination with approved Alzheimer's disease treatment, such as acetylcholinesterase inhibitors or memantine, in the clinical trials.

Aside from Alzheimer's disease, there are other amyloid beta related diseases, in which solanezumab could be used, e.g., Down syndrome or cerebral amyloid angiopathy. However, this has not been studied so far.

== Adverse effects ==
No safety concerns were detected in any of the studies. A few patients suffered from mild infusion reactions that resolved on their own. The measured laboratory values and vital signs, showed no changes. Other adverse events that occurred, e.g., headache or hematoma, were not considered as related to treatment.

Other anti-amyloid beta antibodies caused amyloid-related imaging abnormalities, which is not the case for solanezumab.

== Pharmacology ==
=== Mechanism of action ===
Solanezumab binds the amyloid-β peptides that aggregate and form plaques in the brain that are an early pathological feature of Alzheimer's disease. Solanezumab binds the central epitope of monomeric amyloid-β, KLVFFAED, (PDB ID 4XXD) with picomolar affinity. This epitope is known as the nucleation site for Aβ oligomerization, and it is these oligomers of Aβ that are thought to be toxic to neurons.

Solanezumab is thought to act as an "amyloid beta sink" that is "facilitating flux of amyloid beta from a central to peripheral compartment". This increases the peripheral elimination of both amyloid beta and the antibody. Amyloid beta plaques mostly consist of amyloid beta42. Solanezumab binds free amyloid beta which causes amyloid beta42 to solubilize to reestablish the equilibrium in the cerebrospinal fluid.

== Manufacturing ==
Solanezumab is expressed in Chinese hamster ovary cells. The produced antibodies are extracted and purified according to the standard procedures of the art.

== Society and culture ==
=== Commercial aspects ===
Solanezumab is developed and investigated by Eli Lilly and Company, Indianapolis, IN. It is covered under the patent US 7,195,761 B2, which was filed in 2002 by Eli Lilly, Indianapolis, IN, and Washington University in St. Louis.

In 2011, TPG-Axon Capital funded part of the phase 3 trials. It will receive an estimated $70 million of based on sales milestones after the launch of the product.

== Preclinical trials ==
The first evidence that antibodies binding the central amyloid beta domain are effective in the treatment of Alzheimer's disease was found in transgenic mice, which express the human amyloid beta precursor protein. Treatment with a murine analog of solanezumab (m266) lead to an increase in plasma amyloid beta, which was all bound to m266. Additionally, the amount of both free amyloid beta in the brain and amyloid beta in plaques was significantly decreased.

Due to those results, it is postulated that m266 binds free amyloid beta in the plasma and, therefore, changes the amyloid beta equilibrium between plasma and brain.

== Clinical trials ==
=== Phase 1 ===
In a single-dose, placebo-controlled study (H8A-LC-LZAH) in 19 patients with mild-to-moderate Alzheimer's disease, solanezumab was well tolerated over the whole dose range. There were no severe adverse drug reactions. All patients showed dose-dependent amyloid beta responses, but no change in cognition. This negative outcome was expected after only a single dose.

=== Phase 2 ===
52 patients with mild-to-moderate Alzheimer's disease underwent a parallel group, double-blind, randomized, placebo controlled phase 2 trial. They received weekly infusions of either saline or antibody for 12 weeks. The placebo group received only saline, whereas the antibody groups received four different concentrations of solanezumab infusions or saline. They were dosed with either 100 mg every 4 weeks, 100 mg weekly, 400 mg every 4 weeks or 400 mg weekly.

Plasma amyloid beta levels increased dose dependently over the course of treatment. In the cerebrospinal fluid amyloid beta40 increased, whereas amyloid beta42 increased. This could be due to a change in equilibrium between plasma, cerebrospinal fluid and amyloid beta plaques. However, there were no significant changes in cognition and memory.

=== Phase 3 ===
Solanezumab was tested in two phase 3 clinical trials, EXPEDITION 1 and 2 (NCT00905372 and NCT00904683). Both were randomized, double-blind and placebo-controlled. Patients with mild-to-moderate Alzheimer's disease received either placebo or 400 mg solanezumab infusions every 4 weeks over 18 months.

A total of 1012 patients participated in EXPEDITION 1, EXPEDITION 2 enrolled another 1040 patients. Both studies were not able to show a difference in cognition and memory between the treated and the placebo group. However, a subgroup analysis of only patients with mild Alzheimer's disease showed less worsening of cognition in patients receiving solanezumab compared to placebo, which means the progression of the disease was slowed down. There was no effect on disease progression in patients with moderate symptoms.

Since the first two EXPEDITION trials show a positive effect in patients with mild Alzheimer's disease, Lilly launched another phase 3 trial, EXPEDITION 3 (NCT01900665). Patients with mild Alzheimer's disease received 400 mg solanezumab every 4 weeks for 80 weeks. Afterwards they can continue treatment for a total of 208 weeks, if wanted. This trial failed to show positive results, despite the high expectations. The trial will be finalized in 2020.

The Anti-Amyloid Treatment in Asymptomatic Alzheimer's (A4) study is a phase 3 clinical trial to evaluate whether solanezumab can slow cognitive decline in cognitively unimpaired older adults with elevated levels of amyloid β. In July 2023, the final data showed that it did not slow cognitive decline as compared with placebo over a period of 240 weeks in persons with preclinical Alzheimer's disease.
