= Active immunization =

Natural or therapeutic induction of immunity after exposure to an antigen

Active immunization is the induction of immunity after exposure to an antigen. Antibodies are created by the recipient and may be stored permanently. This creates memory cells which will respond if the same pathogen appears again.

== Cause ==
Active immunization can occur naturally when microbes or other antigen are received by a person who has not yet come into contact with the microbes and has no pre-made antibodies for defense. It happens with the adaptive immune system and after exposure to antigen, it will create memory cells.The immune system will eventually create antibodies for the microbes, but this is a slow process and, if the microbes are dead, there may not be enough time for the antibodies to be used.

=== Artificial active immunisation ===
Artificial active immunization is where the microbe is injected into the person before they are able to take it in naturally. The microbe is treated, so that it will not harm the infected person. Depending on the type of disease, this technique also works with dead microbes, parts of the microbe, or treated toxins from the microbe. A common example of this form of active immunisation is vaccinations.

== See also ==
- Immunization
- Passive immunity
