= Accelerated approval (FDA) =

US program for faster approval of drugs

The United States Food and Drug Administration (FDA) initiated the FDA Accelerated Approval Program in 1992 to allow faster approval of drugs for serious conditions that fill an unmet medical need. The faster approval relies on use of surrogate endpoints. Drug approval typically requires clinical trials with endpoints that demonstrate a clinical benefit, such as increased survival for cancer patients. Drugs with accelerated approval can initially be tested in clinical trials that use a surrogate endpoint, or something that is thought to predict clinical benefit. Surrogate endpoints typically require less time, and in the case of a cancer patient, it is much faster to measure a reduction in tumor size, for example, than overall patient survival.

Drugs approved under the FDA Accelerated Approval Program still need to be tested in clinical trials using endpoints that demonstrate clinical benefit, and those trials are known as phase 4 confirmatory trials. If the drug later proves unable to demonstrate clinical benefit to patients, the FDA may withdraw approval. A study published in 2023, following a similar study focused on oncology in 2022, suggested that the Accelerated Approval Program was having the intended impact of shortening the timeline to either traditional approval or withdrawal of applications in cases where confirmatory trials had begun before the start of the Accelerated Approval process; further, there appeared to be no impact on the ratio of approval to withdrawal whether accelerated or traditional pathway was used.

== Controversies ==
In 2022 Congress investigated the accelerated passage and approval of the Alzheimers drug Aduhelm, manufactured by Biogen and being marketed at $56,000 per patient a year. Although the FDA usually follows an advisory committee's recommendation, the investigation found that the FDA decided to consider it under the accelerated approval pathway even though none of the 11 members of the committee recommended Aduhelm approval. They found that the FDA inappropriately collaborated with the maker when it granted accelerated approval and that it was released in June 2021 despite concerns raised by experts about the inconsistency of the drug's clinical data. The FDA also gave the drug a broad label, allowing it to be used on all Alzheimer's patients regardless of severity, even though it had only been tested on people with early Alzheimer's and mild symptoms. According to the report, Biogen knew its $56,000 launch price was "unjustifiably high", but company executives wanted to "make history" and "establish Aduhelm as one of the top pharmaceutical launches of all time".

== See also ==
- Fast track (FDA)
- Orphan drug
