= Alzheimer Disease and Associated Disorders =

- Discipline: Neurology, Psychiatry
- Language: English
- Edited by: José A. Luchsinger, MD, MPH

Publication details
- History: 1987–present
- Publisher: Lippincott Williams & Wilkins (United States)
- Frequency: quarterly
- Impact factor: 2.1 (2022)

Standard abbreviations
- ISO 4: Alzheimer Dis. Assoc. Disord.

Indexing
- CODEN: ADADE2
- ISSN: 0893-0341 (print); 1546-4156 (web)
- OCLC no.: 13162880

Links
- Journal homepage; Online access; Online archive

Alzheimer Disease and Associated Disorders is a quarterly peer-reviewed medical journal publishing original research findings and new approaches to diagnosis and treatment for Alzheimer's disease and related disorders. Articles published emphasize research in humans including epidemiologic studies, clinical trials and experimental studies, studies of diagnosis and biomarkers, as well as research on health effects of people with dementia and their caregivers. The scientific portion of the journal is augmented by reviews of the current literature, concepts, conjectures, and hypotheses in dementia, brief reports, and letters to the editor.
