= Amyloid beta =

Group of peptides

Amyloid beta peptide (beta-APP)
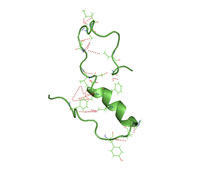
- A partially folded structure of amyloid beta(1 40) in an aqueous environment (pdb 2lfm)

Identifiers
- Symbol: APP
- Pfam: PF03494
- InterPro: IPR013803
- SCOP2: 2lfm / SCOPe / SUPFAM
- TCDB: 1.C.50
- OPM superfamily: 304
- OPM protein: 2y3k
- Membranome: 45
Available protein structures:
- PDB: IPR013803 PF03494 (ECOD; PDBsum)
- AlphaFold: IPR013803; PF03494

amyloid beta (A4) precursor protein (peptidase nexin-II, Alzheimer disease)
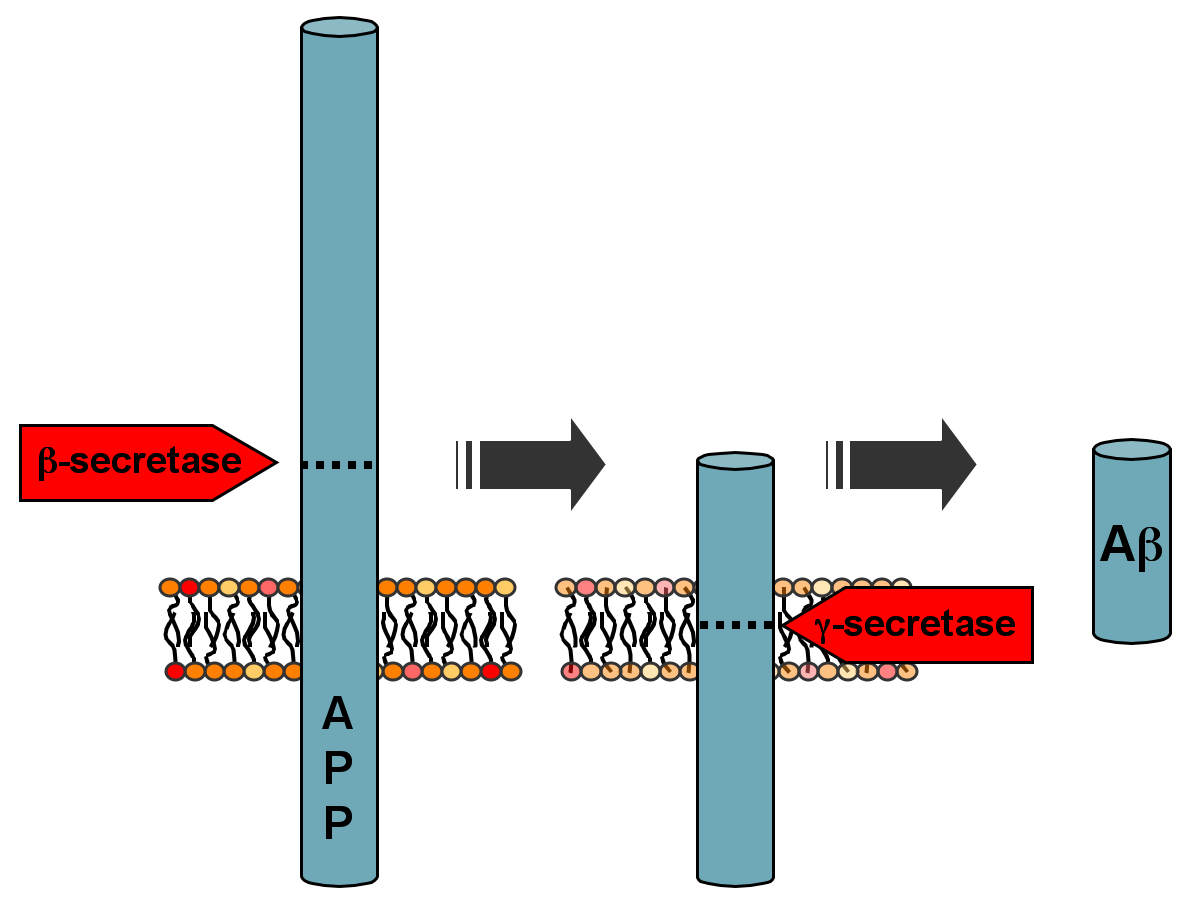
- Processing of the amyloid precursor protein

Identifiers
- Symbol: APP
- Alt. symbols: AD1
- NCBI gene: 351
- HGNC: 620
- OMIM: 104760
- RefSeq: NM_000484
- UniProt: P05067

Other data
- Locus: Chr. 21 q21.2
Search for
- Structures: Swiss-model
- Domains: InterPro

Amyloid beta (Aβ, Abeta or beta-amyloid) denotes peptides of 36–43 amino acids that are the main component of the amyloid plaques found in the brains of people with Alzheimer's disease. The peptides derive from the amyloid-beta precursor protein (APP), which is cleaved by beta secretase and gamma secretase to yield Aβ in a cholesterol-dependent process and substrate presentation. Both neurons and oligodendrocytes produce and release Aβ in the brain, contributing to formation of amyloid plaques. Aβ molecules can aggregate to form flexible soluble oligomers which may exist in several forms. It is now believed that certain misfolded oligomers and larger assemblies of Aβ (known as "seeds") can induce other Aβ molecules to also take the misfolded molecular form, leading to a chain reaction akin to a prion infection. Aβ oligomers are toxic to nerve cells. The other protein implicated in Alzheimer's disease, tau protein, also forms such prion-like misfolded oligomers, and there is some evidence that misfolded Aβ can induce tau to misfold.

A study has suggested that APP and its amyloid potential is of ancient origins, dating as far back as early deuterostomes.

== Normal function ==
The normal function of Aβ is not yet known. Though some animal studies have shown that the absence of Aβ does not lead to obvious loss of physiological function, several potential activities have been discovered for Aβ, including activation of kinase enzymes, protection against oxidative stress, regulation of cholesterol transport, functioning as a transcription factor, and anti-microbial activity (potentially associated with Aβ's pro-inflammatory activity).

The glymphatic system clears metabolic waste from the mammalian brain, and in particular amyloid beta. A number of proteases have been implicated by both genetic and biochemical studies as being responsible for the recognition and degradation of amyloid beta; these include insulin degrading enzyme and presequence protease. The rate of removal is significantly increased during sleep. However, the significance of the glymphatic system in Aβ clearance in Alzheimer's disease is unknown.

== Aβ in disease ==
=== Alzheimer's disease ===
Aβ is the main component of the amyloid plaques that form in the brains of people with Alzheimer's disease. Aβ can also form the deposits that line cerebral blood vessels in cerebral amyloid angiopathy, which frequently occurs in Alzheimer's. The plaques and vascular amyloid consist primarily of aggregated Aβ polymers called amyloid fibrils that are made of strings of misfolded Aβ protein molecules. Some research suggests that soluble oligomeric forms of Aβ are especially toxic and therefore may be causative agents in the development of Alzheimer's disease.

The "amyloid hypothesis" (or "amyloid cascade hypothesis") holds that the misfolding and buildup of Aβ, in plaques and/or as oligomers that may act outside of plaques, is the defining disease mechanism that drives Alzheimer's disease. This hypothesis has been the dominant explanation for the development of Alzheimer's disease since the 1990s. Abnormal Aβ is clearly involved in people who develop early-onset Alzheimer's disease caused by genetic mutations, but because some people who have plaques do not show clear signs of dementia, some scientists have questioned the role of Aβ in the more common idiopathic types of the disease. Several genetic, cell biological, biochemical and animal studies using experimental models support the concept that Aβ plays a central role in the development of Alzheimer's disease pathology.

Significant efforts have been focused on the mechanisms responsible for Aβ production, including the proteolytic enzymes gamma-secretase and β-secretase, which generate Aβ from its precursor protein, APP (amyloid-beta precursor protein). Aβ circulates in plasma, cerebrospinal fluid (CSF) and brain interstitial fluid (ISF) mainly as soluble Aβ40. Amyloid plaques contain both Aβ40 and Aβ42, while vascular amyloid is predominantly the shorter Aβ40. Several sequences of Aβ were found in both lesions.

Increases in either total Aβ levels or the relative concentration of both Aβ40 and Aβ42 (where the former is more concentrated in cerebral amyloid angiopathy and the latter in neuritic plaques) have been implicated in the pathogenesis of both familial and sporadic Alzheimer's disease. Due to its more hydrophobic nature, Aβ42 is the most amyloidogenic form of the peptide. However the central sequence KLVFFAE is known to form amyloid on its own, and probably forms the core of the fibril.

=== Cerebral amyloid angiopathy (CAA) ===
Cerebral amyloid angiopathy (Aβ type) is a disease of the brain’s blood vessels in which misfolded Aβ accumulates in the walls of small to medium-sized blood vessels. Unlike Aβ plaques, CAA consists predominantly of the shorter 40-amino acid version of Aβ. CAA can cause the vascular wall to weaken, resulting in bleeding within the brain, and it has been linked to cognitive decline and other neurologic problems independent of other Alzheimer’s disease pathology. CAA is abundant in many (but not all) cases of Alzheimer’s disease, being moderate-to-severe in approximately half of Alzheimer cases. In rare instances, iatrogenic CAA has been caused by the prion-like seeding of Aβ in persons treated with (now discontinued) human-derived biologic materials such as growth hormone or patches made of dura mater that were contaminated with Aβ seeds.

=== Down syndrome ===
Because the APP gene is on chromosome 21, people with trisomy 21 (Down syndrome) produce excess Aβ and often develop Alzheimer's disease later in life. In addition to the accumulation of Aβ in association with other pathological evidence of Alzheimer's disease, they can experience declines in cognitive functioning, memory, fine motor movements, executive functioning, and visuospatial skills.

=== Cancer ===
While Aβ has been implicated in cancer development, prompting studies on a variety of cancers to elucidate the nature of its possible effects, results are largely inconclusive. Aβ levels have been assessed in relation to a number of cancers, including esophageal, colorectal, lung, and hepatic, in response to observed reductions in risk for developing Alzheimer's disease in survivors of these cancers. All cancers were shown to be associated positively with increased Aβ levels, particularly hepatic cancers. This direction of association however has not yet been established. Studies focusing on human breast cancer cell lines have further demonstrated that these cancerous cells display an increased level of expression of amyloid precursor protein.

== Formation ==
Aβ is formed after sequential cleavage of the amyloid precursor protein (APP), a transmembrane glycoprotein of undetermined function. APP can be cleaved by the proteolytic enzymes α-, β- and γ-secretase; Aβ protein is generated by successive action of the β and γ secretases. The γ secretase, which cuts APP at the C-terminal end of the Aβ peptide, cleaves within the transmembrane region of APP and can generate a number of isoforms of 30–51 amino acid residues in length. The most common isoforms are Aβ_{40} and Aβ_{42}; the longer form is typically produced by cleavage that occurs in the endoplasmic reticulum, while the shorter form is produced by cleavage in the trans-Golgi network.

== Genetics ==
Autosomal-dominant mutations in APP cause hereditary early-onset Alzheimer's disease (familial AD, fAD). This form of AD accounts for no more than 10% of all cases, and the vast majority of AD is not accompanied by such mutations. However, familial Alzheimer's disease is likely to result from altered proteolytic processing. This is evidenced by the fact that many mutations that lead to fAD occur near γ-secretase cleavage sites on APP. One of the most common mutations causing fAD, the London Mutation, occurs at codon 717 of the APP gene, and results in a valine to isoleucine amino acid substitution. Histochemical analysis of the APP V717I mutation has revealed extensive Aβ pathology throughout the neuroaxis as well as widespread cerebral amyloid angiopathy (CAA). Because the gene for the amyloid precursor protein is located on chromosome 21, people with Down syndrome have a very high incidence of Alzheimer's disease.

== Structure and toxicity ==
Amyloid beta is commonly thought to be intrinsically unstructured, meaning that in solution it does not acquire a unique tertiary fold but rather populates a set of structures. As such, it cannot be crystallized and most structural knowledge on amyloid beta comes from NMR and molecular dynamics. Early NMR-derived models of a 26-aminoacid polypeptide from amyloid beta (Aβ 10–35) show a collapsed coil structure devoid of significant secondary structure content. However, the most recent (2012) NMR structure of (Aβ 1-40) has significant secondary and tertiary structure. Replica exchange molecular dynamics studies suggested that amyloid beta can indeed populate multiple discrete structural states; more recent studies identified a multiplicity of discrete conformational clusters by statistical analysis. By NMR-guided simulations, amyloid beta 1-40 and amyloid beta 1-42 also seem to feature highly different conformational states, with the C-terminus of amyloid beta 1-42 being more structured than that of the 1-40 fragment.

Low-temperature and low-salt conditions can enable formation of pentameric disc-shaped oligomers devoid of beta structure. In contrast, soluble oligomers prepared in the presence of detergents seem to feature substantial beta sheet content with mixed parallel and antiparallel character, different from fibrils; computational studies suggest an antiparallel beta-turn-beta motif instead for membrane-embedded oligomers.

== Immunotherapy research ==
Immunotherapy can stimulate the host immune system to recognize and attack Aβ (active immunization) or provide anti-Aβ antibodies produced outside the body (passive immunization) to prevent plaque formation or enhance the clearance of plaques or Aβ oligomers. In passive immunization, antibodies that target Aβ and have been tested in clinical trials include aducanumab, bapineuzumab, crenezumab, gantenerumab, lecanemab, and solanezumab.

== Measuring amyloid beta ==
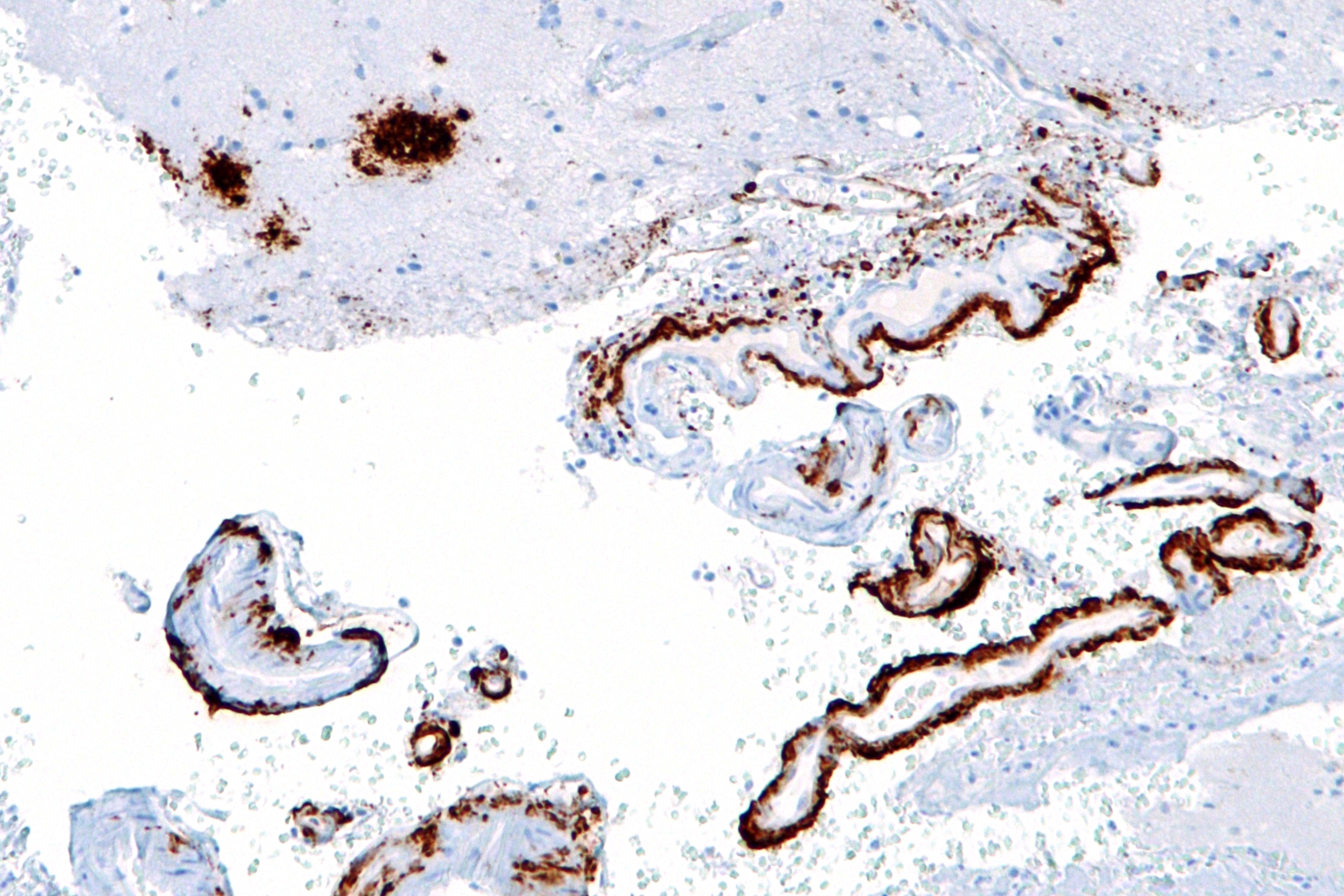
Micrograph showing amyloid beta (brown) in amyloid plaques of the cerebral cortex (upper left of image) and cerebral blood vessels (right of image) with immunostaining

Imaging compounds, notably Pittsburgh compound B, (6-OH-BTA-1, a thioflavin), can selectively bind to amyloid beta in vitro and in vivo. This technique, combined with PET imaging, is used to image areas of plaque deposits in those with Alzheimer's.

=== Post mortem or in tissue biopsies ===
Amyloid beta can be measured semiquantitatively with immunostaining, which also allows one to determine location. Amyloid beta may be primarily vascular, as in cerebral amyloid angiopathy, or in amyloid plaques which are mainly located in grey matter.

One sensitive method is ELISA, which is an immunosorbent assay that uses a pair of antibodies that recognize amyloid beta.

Atomic force microscopy, which can visualize nanoscale molecular surfaces, can be used to determine the aggregation state of amyloid beta in vitro.

Vibrational microspectroscopy is a label-free method that measures the vibration of molecules in tissue samples. Amyloid proteins like Aβ can be detected with this technique because of their high content of β-sheet structures.

Dual polarisation interferometry is an optical technique which can measure early stages of aggregation by measuring the molecular size and densities as the fibrils elongate. These aggregate processes can also be studied on lipid bilayer constructs.

== See also ==
- TPM21
- Sylvain Lesné – Aβ*56
