= Clinical Dementia Rating =

Numeric scale for severity of dementia

- Purpose: to determine the stage of dementia
- Based on: severity of symptoms

The Clinical Dementia Rating or CDR is a numeric scale used to assess the stage of dementia, based on the severity of symptoms.

== Scale ==
Using a structured-interview protocol developed by Charles Hughes, Leonard Berg, John C. Morris and other colleagues at Washington University School of Medicine, a qualified health professional assesses a patient's cognitive and functional performance in six areas: memory, orientation, judgment & problem solving, community affairs, home & hobbies, and personal care. Scores in each of these are combined to obtain a composite score ranging from 0 through 3. Clinical Dementia Rating Assignment Qualitative equivalences are as follows:NACC Clinical Dementia Rating

Composite Rating	Symptoms
0	none
0.5	very mild
1	mild
2	moderate
3	severe

CDR is credited with being able to discern very mild impairments, but its weaknesses include the amount of time it takes to administer, its ultimate reliance on subjective assessment, and relative inability to capture changes over time.

== Validity ==
While the assessment is ultimately subjective in nature, recent studies have suggested a very high interrater reliability. Thus the CDR is a reliable and valid tool for assessing and staging dementia.

== Importance ==
With increasing clinical focus on dementia, there is likewise increasing interest in pharmacology in the development of drugs to halt, or slow the progression of dementia-related illness such as Alzheimer's Disease. Therefore, early and accurate diagnosis of dementia and staging can be essential to proper clinical care. Without the ability to reliably assess dementia across the board, the misuse of anti-dementia compounds could have negative consequences, such as patients receiving the wrong medication, or not receiving treatment in the early stages of dementia when it is most needed.
