= Intracranial hemorrhage =

Bleeding within the skull

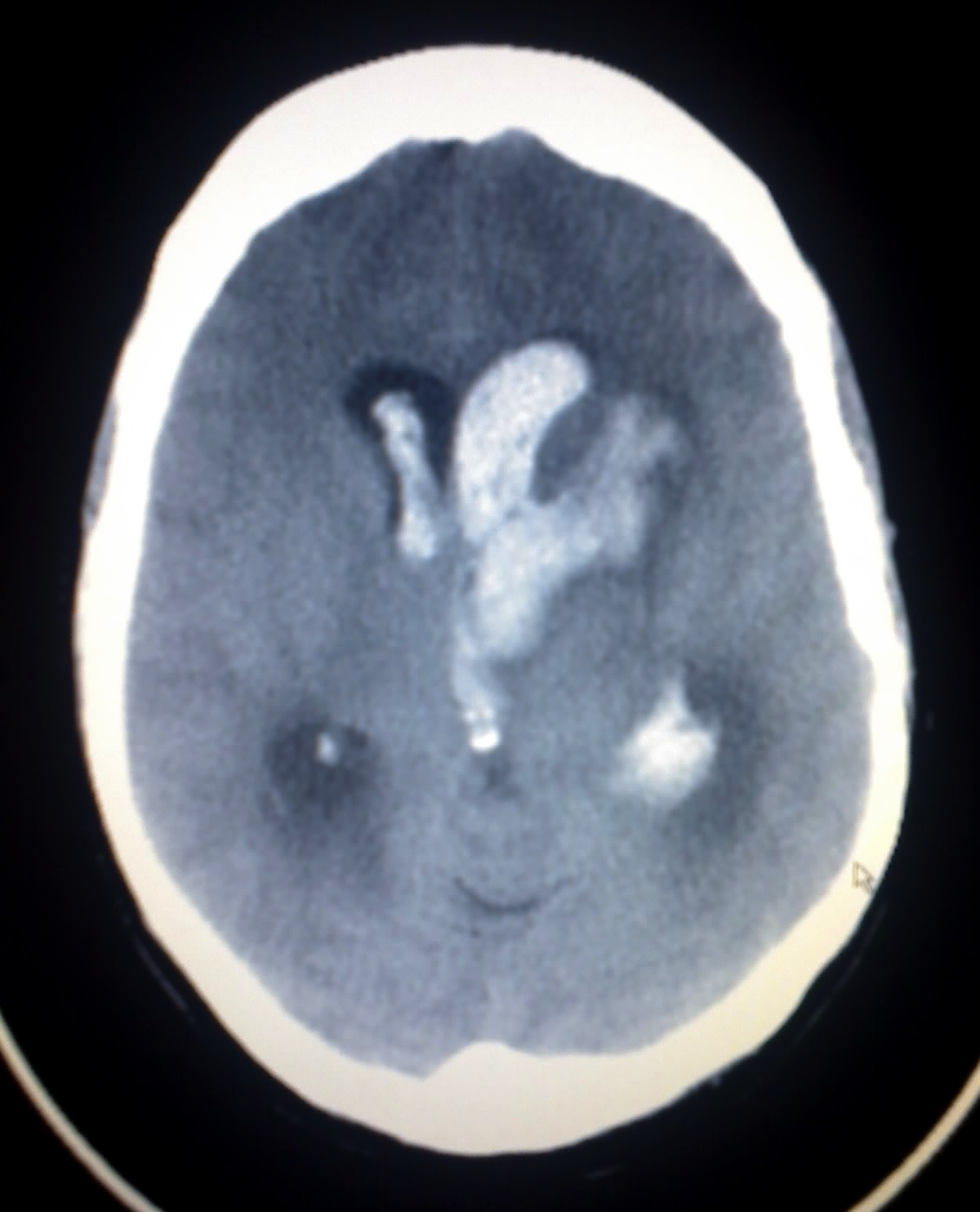
- Axial CT scan of a spontaneous intracranial hemorrhage
- Specialty: Neurosurgery, neurocritical care, emergency medicine
- Symptoms: Same symptoms as ischemic stroke, but unconsciousness, headache, nausea, stiff neck, and seizures are more often in brain hemorrhages than ischemic strokes
- Complications: Coma, persistent vegetative state, cardiac arrest (when bleeding is in the brain stem or is severe), death
- Types: Intracerebral hemorrhage, subarachnoid hemorrhage, epidural bleed, subdural bleed
- Causes: Stroke, head injury, ruptured aneurysm

Intracranial hemorrhage (ICH) is bleeding within the skull. It can result from trauma, vascular abnormalities, hypertension, or other medical conditions. ICH is broadly categorized into several subtypes based on the location of the bleed: intracerebral hemorrhage (including intraparenchymal and intraventricular hemorrhages), subarachnoid hemorrhage, epidural hemorrhage, and subdural hematoma. Each subtype has distinct causes, clinical features, and treatment approaches.

== Epidemiology ==
Acute, spontaneous intracranial hemorrhage (ICH) is the second most common form of stroke, affecting approximately 2 million people worldwide each year. In the United States, intracranial hemorrhage accounts for about 20% of all cerebrovascular accidents, with an incidence of approximately 20 cases per 100,000 people annually. Intracranial hemorrhages is diagnosed more frequently in men and individuals over the age of 55, with incidence increasing with age. In low-income countries, the risk is higher, potentially due to reduced access to healthcare and limited education about primary prevention.

== Risk factors and causes ==
Intracranial hemorrhage (ICH) may be classified as either traumatic or non-traumatic (spontaneous). Traumatic causes include head trauma resulting from falls, vehicular accidents, or physical assault. Non-traumatic causes are more varied and often related to underlying conditions. Chronic hypertension is the most common non-traumatic cause, particularly in deep brain structures such as the basal ganglia, thalamus, pons, and posterior fossa. Other spontaneous causes include cerebral amyloid angiopathy, especially among the elderly, as well as bleeding disorders such as hemophilia and thrombocytopenia, vascular malformations like arteriovenous malformation (AVMs), and brain tumors.

The use of anticoagulant or antiplatelet medications, such as warfarin and aspirin, has been associated with increased hematoma volume and expansion. Illicit drug use, particularly cocaine and methamphetamine, can cause abrupt spikes in blood pressure leading to vessel rupture and subsequent hemorrhage.

Additional risk factors that increase the likelihood of intracranial hemorrhage include smoking, heavy alcohol consumption, advanced age, a family history of stroke, diabetes, hyperlipidemia, obesity, and sedentary lifestyle. Hypertension remains the most prevalent and well-established risk factor, contributing to over 60% of primary bleeds.

== Signs and symptoms ==
Intracranial hemorrhage is a dynamic and potentially life-threatening process that begins with blood extravasation into the brain parenchyma. This can be followed by bleeding extension, cerebral edema formation, and increased intracranial pressure (ICP), all of which can lead to neural tissue compression.

Common signs and symptoms include a sudden onset of focal neurological deficits, which vary depending on the location of the hemorrhage. Decreased levels of consciousness are frequently observed and are assessed using the Glasgow Coma Scale (GCS). Other manifestations include headache, nausea, vomiting, and seizures. Patients may also present with speech disturbances, unilateral weakness or paralysis, sensory deficits, visual impairments, and problems with coordination or balance. Raised diastolic blood pressure is a common clinical finding.

Seizures occur in up to 70% of causes, usually within the first 24 to 72 hours following hemorrhage onset. If bleeding extends into the ventricles, hydrocephalus may develop. Brainstem hemorrhages are especially dangerous and can result in cardiorespiratory instability, decreased consciousness, and even cardiac arrest. Long-term complications of intracranial hemorrhages may include post-stroke epilepsy and vascular cognitive impairment.

== Diagnosis ==
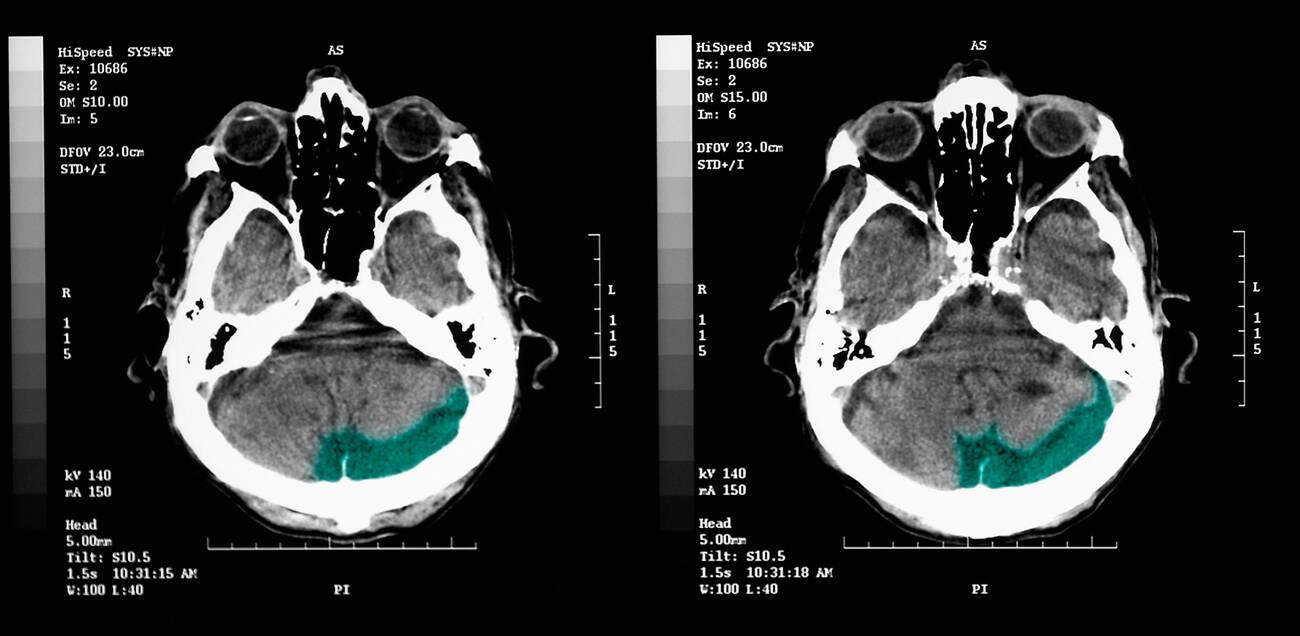
An axial non-contrast CT (NCCT) brain scan, a frontline neuroimaging modality utilized for the rapid assessment and triage of acute intracranial hemorrhage and head injuries.

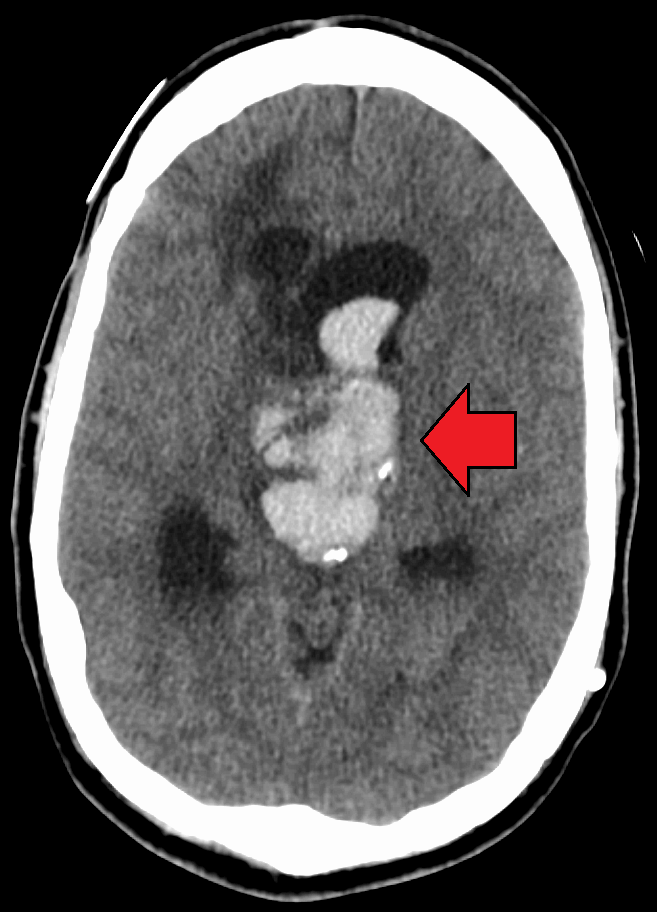
An acute bleed into a long-standing cystic mass within the brain. Arrow points to bleeding and mass.

A non-contrast CT scan (computed tomography) of the brain is commonly used as the initial imaging modality in suspected cases of intracranial hemorrhage. CT is preferred in emergency settings due to its speed, availability, and high sensitivity for detecting acute brain injuries, enabling rapid triage and surgical decision-making. Examples of brain diseases that require urgent intervention are: large-volume hemorrhage, brain herniation, and cerebral infarction. Additional advantages of CT imaging include its effectiveness in detecting bony fractures, vascular injuries, and cerebrospinal fluid (CSF) leaks.

Despite its advantages, MRI (magnetic resonance imaging) has higher sensitivity than CT scan for the detection of epidural hemorrhage, subdural hemorrhage, subarachnoid hemorrhage, non hemorrhagic contusions in the cortex, hemorrhagic parenchymal contusions, brainstem injuries, and white matter axonal injuries. MRI is typically used when a patient continues to display neurological symptoms despite a normal CT scan. However, the use of MRI is limited by safety concerns regarding metallic foreign bodies, longer imaging times, and higher sensitivity to motion, reducing availability, and increased cost.

A swirl sign on CT imaging— representing areas of low density with surrounding areas of high density— suggest active intracranial bleeding. The presence of this sign is associated with an increase in risk of death within one month and a poor functional prognosis at three months among survivors.

== Traumatic ==
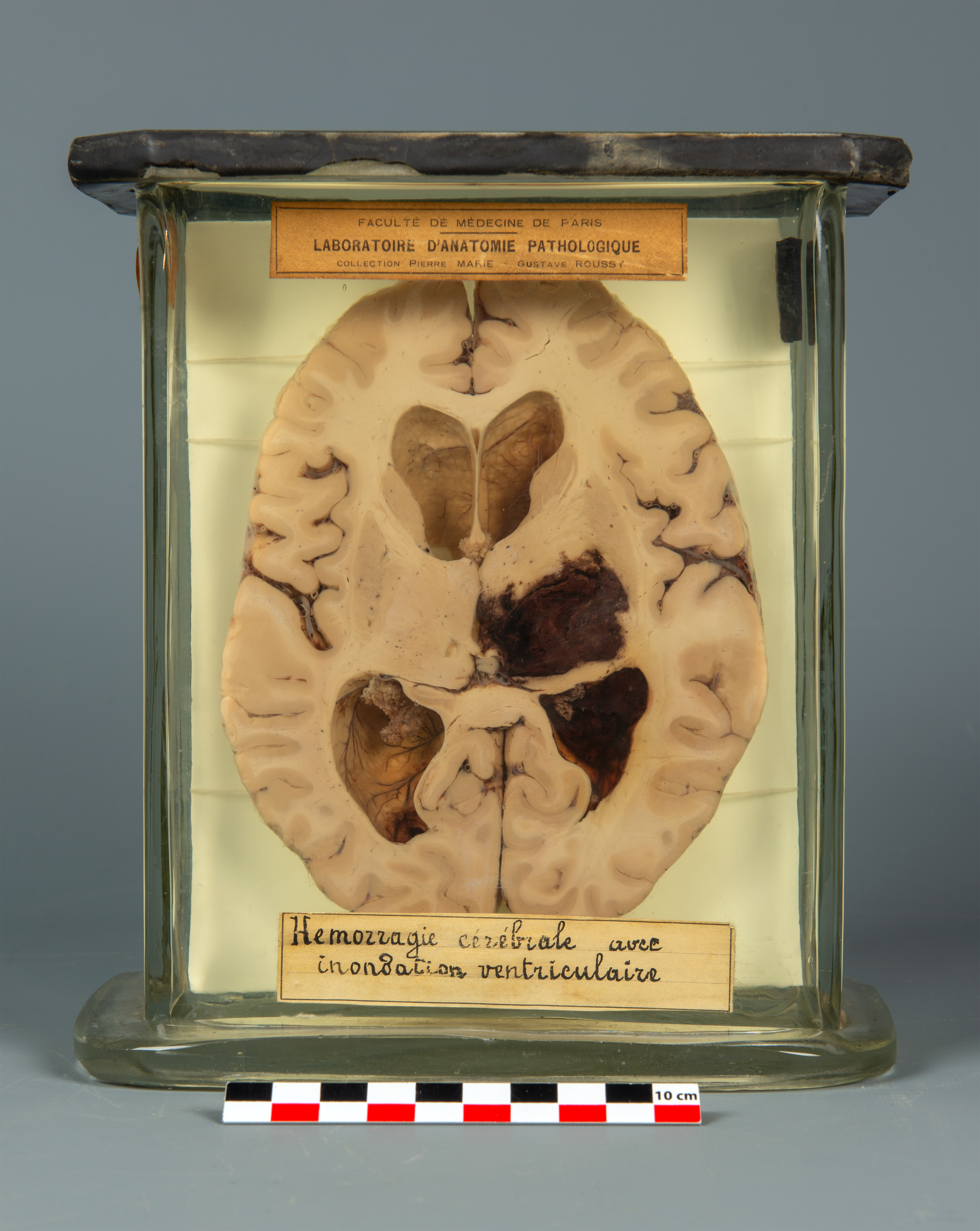
Cerebral hemorrhage with ventricular flooding in 1912 (Sorbonne University).

Intracranial hemorrhages are broadly classified into intra-axial and extra-axial types, based on the location of the bleeding relative to the brain tissue.

Intra-axial hemorrhage refers to bleeding that occurs within the brain parenchyma or ventricular system. This category includes intraparenchymal hemorrhage, which involves bleeding directly into the brain tissue, and intraventricular hemorrhage, which involves bleeding into the brain’s ventricular system—commonly observed in premature infants. Intra-axial hemorrhages are generally associated with a poorer prognosis and are more challenging to manage than extra-axial hemorrhages. Traumatic forms of intra-axial hemorrhage include hemorrhagic parenchymal contusions and cerebral microhemorrhages.

Extra-axial hemorrhage occurs within the cranial vault but outside the brain tissue. It encompasses three main subtypes: epidural hematoma, subdural hematoma, and subarachnoid hemorrhage, each defined by the specific meningeal compartment in which the bleeding occurs.

=== Hemorrhagic parenchymal contusion ===
Hemorrhagic parenchymal contusions most commonly occur following significant head trauma, particularly in cases involving rapid head movement or direct impact. These injuries result from the disruption of small arterial or venous vessels, leading to hemorrhage within the brain parenchyma. On computed tomography (CT), they appear as hyperdense lesions. Magnetic resonance imaging (MRI), particularly with gradient echo sequences, is more sensitive than CT in detecting small hemorrhagic contusions.

Contusions are frequently observed in areas of the brain adjacent to the base of the skull, such as the inferior frontal lobess and temporal lobes, commonly resulting from coup-contrecoup injuries. Those with parenchymal contusion require frequent follow-up imaging because such contusions may grow large enough to become hemorrhage and exert a significant mass effect on the brain.

=== Cerebral microhemorrhage ===
Cerebral microhemorrhages are small-scale hemorrhagic lesions that can be considered a minor form of hemorrhagic parenchymal contusion. They are typically located within the cerebral white matter and are challenging to detect using CT imaging. However, they are more readily identified on MRI, particularly with gradient echo or susceptibility-weighted imaging (SWI), where they appear as hypointense foci due to susceptibility blooming artifacts. Such microhemorrhages are frequently associated with diffuse axonal injury and located near the grey–white matter junction.

=== Epidural hemorrhage ===
Epidural hemorrhage (also known as extradural hemorrhage, EDH) refers to bleeding between the dura mater and the inner surface of the skull, typically resulting from traumatic head injury. This condition is characterized by its inability to cross cranial suture lines due to the tight adhesion of the dura to the skull at these points. However, in rare cases—especially in children where skull sutures are not fully fused—epidural hemorrhages may extend across sutures if a fracture involves them.

On computed tomography (CT), epidural hemorrhages typically appear as biconvex (lentiform) hyperdense lesions confined by sutural boundaries. The source of bleeding may be arterial or venous. Arterial injuries, such as to the middle meninges artery, commonly at the pterion, lead to rapidly expanding hematomas. Venous sources are usually slower-growing and may involve dural venous sinuses, including the falx cerebri, tentorium cerebelli, or the superior sagittal sinus.

Anterior temporal EDH is usually caused by sphenoparietal sinus. Such EDH is limited and does not require surgery because its extension is confined within the sphenosquamosal suture and the superior or inferior orbital fissures. In 20% to 50% of epidural hemorrhage cases, there is a lucid interval during which the patient regains temporary consciousness after an initial loss; this is then followed by deterioration of conscious state.

When the epidural hematoma is large enough, it will cause mass effect on contralateral brain which lead to midline, subfalcine (below the falx cerebri), and trans-tentorial (crossing tentorium cerebelli) herniations. This phenomenon can cause the subject to lose consciousness and eventually death. Large EDH often requires emergent surgical clot evacuation. Embolisation of middle meningeal artery is performed if the hemorrhage is medium or small.

=== Subdural hemorrhage ===
Subdural hemorrhage (SDH) results from tearing of the bridging veins in the subdural space between the dura and arachnoid mater. It can cross the suture lines, but not across dural reflections such as falx cerebri or tentorium cerebelli. Therefore, subdural hematoma are typically confined to one side of the cerebral hemisphere.

Density of SDH reduces as it progresses from acute to chronic forms. However, areas with low density may not represent chronic SDH entirely as unclotted blood products that are due to active bleed can also give low density appearance on CT scans especially those with coagulopathy. Those with SDH that have same density with brain parenchyma may represent acute bleed such as those with anemia, arachnoid tear, and the mixing of hemorrhage and CSF. SDH usually have high or mixed densities during first two days of trauma, followed by isodensity at 11 days after trauma, and hypodensity after 14 days of trauma. Membranes with granulation tissue can rupture within SDH, and give high density appearance on CT scan. Over a prolonged period of time, calcifications can form. SDH can be treated with burr hole drainage, craniotomy or port system placement for blood clot evacuation, or middle meningeal artery embolisation.

Subdural hematoma maybe less acute than epidural hematoma due to slower blood accumulation, but it still has the potential to cause brain herniation that may require surgical evacuation. Clinical features depend on the location and severity of the injury. Patients may have a history of loss of consciousness but they recover and do not relapse. Symptoms vary but may include loss of consciousness, seizures, or focal neurologic deficits, with an onset that can be delayed by hours to days after injury.

=== Subarachnoid hemorrhage ===
A subarachnoid hemorrhage (SAH) is bleeding into the subarachnoid space—the area between the arachnoid membrane and the pia mater surrounding the brain. Trauma can also cause SAH when the arteries and veins coursing through the subarachnoid space are ruptured.

On CT imaging, traumatic SAH is usually localized to the cerebral sulci near the vertex of the head and typically spares the basal cisterns. Severe trauma can cause SAH in all regions of the brain. When the SAH volume is large, rarely it can cause cerebral infarction a few days after trauma due to arterial vasospasm.

Although CT scans are more frequently used for initial evaluation, MRI is more sensitive than CT in detecting SAH. Findings may include hyperintense signal of fluid-attenuated inversion recovery (FLAIR) sequence and blooming artifact on susceptibility weighted imaging (SWI).

Further vascular imaging, such as CT angiography (CTA) or MR angiography (MRA), is recommended in certain situations—particularly when a skull fracture involves the carotid canal, due to the risk of post-traumatic vasospasm impairing cerebral perfusion. These imaging techniques are also used when the hemorrhage pattern is atypical for trauma, as in isolated SAH located in the basal cisterns, Sylvian fissure, or anterior interhemispheric fissure. Such patterns may suggest ruptured intracranial aneurysms, and warrant further investigation.

== Non-traumatic ==
=== Hypertensive bleed ===
Hypertensive intracerebral hemorrhage (ICH) typically occurs in individuals between 50 and 60 years of age and is associated with high mortality, with case fatality rates ranging from 30% to 50%. Such hemorrhages are typically located in the basal ganglia, cerebellum, or occipital lobes. Less common locations, such as lobar bleeds within the cerebral cortex or intracranial bleeds in people younger than 50 years of age, should prompt further investigation for alternative etiologies, such as brain tumors or cerebral arteriovenous malformation.

The size of the hemorrhage can vary, ranging from small, asymptomatic lesions to large hematomas causing mass effect and increased intracranial pressure. Follow-up CT imaging is recommended to monitor hematoma expansion, ventricular extension, or progressive cerebral edema, all of which are associated with poorer outcomes.

CT angiography (CTA) may be used to assess active bleeding. The presence of a "spot sign"—contrast pooling within the hematoma on delayed-phase imaging—suggests ongoing hemorrhage and is considered a predictor of hematoma and worse clinical prognosis.

=== Cerebral amyloid angiopathy ===
Cerebral amyloid angiopathy (CAA) is a cerebrovascular accident disorder characterized by the deposition of amyloid beta (AB) peptide within the brain. Accumulation of such peptide proteins within the walls of the arteries can cause weakening of the walls and can increase the risk of microhemorrhages.

SAH due to CAA typically occurs in individuals over the age of 60 and can present with transient motor or sensor symptoms. Hemorrhages associated with CAA are usually localized to the lobar white matter adjacent to the cortex, sparing deeper brain structure such as the basal ganglia, brainstem, and posterior fossa. This pattern helps differentiate CAA-related hemorrhage from other causes, such as vasculitis.

Diagnosis of CAA is often based on the Boston criteria, which incorporate clinical, radiological, and histopathological findings to estimate the likelihood of CAA as the cause of hemorrhage. A definitive diagnosis requires histopathological confirmation via brain biopsy or post-mortem examination.

On CT imaging, CAA-related hemorrhages appear as hyperdense lobar intra-axial bleeds, typically in subcortical regions. Diffuse with white matter hypodensities may also be observed, suggesting chronic microangiopathic changes. MRI, especially using gradient echo (GRE) and susceptibility-weighted imaging (SWI) sequences, can detect microbleeds and cortical superficial siderosis, which appear as blooming artifacts—a key imaging feature of CAA.

=== Hemorrhagic conversion of ischemic infarction ===
43% of those with infarcted brain tissue will develop hemorrhagic conversion. Risk of hemorrhagic is further increased with recanalisation of veins or arteries. Several types of hemorrhages can occur such as petechial hemorrhages around the infarcted margin (HI1), confluent petechial hemorrhages within the infarcted tissue (HI2), hematoma occupying less than 30% of the infarcted tissue (PH1), hematoma involving greater than 30% of infarcted tissue with small mass effect (PH2), and hematoma involving greater than 30% of the infarcted tissue with significant mass effect. However, only PH2 is clinically significant. Those who has infarction should be monitored frequently with CT brains to access hemorrhagic conversions or worsening vasogenic oedema that may require neurosurgical decompression. Dual energy CT scan maybe useful to differentiate the high densities caused by reperfusion hemorrhage (bleeding after endovascular stroke treatment) and high density due to iodinated contrast administered during cerebral angiography.

=== Cerebral aneurysm ===
Besides from head injury, it may occur spontaneously, usually from a ruptured cerebral aneurysm (focal outpouchings with weakened walls on the arteries on the brain surface that are prone to rupture). Symptoms of SAH include a severe headache with a rapid onset (thunderclap headache), vomiting, confusion or a lowered level of consciousness, and sometimes seizures. CT scan has 100% sensitivity of detecting SAH at 6 to 24 hours after symptoms onset. The diagnosis is generally confirmed with a CT scan of the head. If CT scan is normal but SAH is still strongly suspected, lumbar puncture can be done at six to twelfth hours after the onset of headache. This is to determine the presence of blood within the cerebrospinal fluid (CSF). Those with SAH will have blood and bilirubin within their CSF because of the degradation of their red blood cells. Meanwhile, those who has blood within CSF due to traumatic lumbar puncture will not have bilirubin within CSF. SAH is generally located within basal cisterns, extends diffusely to all subarachnoid spaces (cerebral sulci) or into the ventricular system, or brain parenchyma. Modified Fisher scale is used to describe the volume and distribution of SAH, just predicting the probability of cerebral artery vasospasm after SAH.

Treatment is by prompt neurosurgery or radiologically-guided interventions with medications and other treatments to help prevent recurrence of the bleeding and complications. Since the 1990s, many aneurysms are treated by a minimal invasive procedure known as endovascular coiling, which is carried out by instrumentation through large blood vessels. However, this procedure has higher recurrence rates than the more invasive craniotomy with clipping.

=== Cerebral ateriovenous malformation ===
Cerebral ateriovenous malformation (Cerebral AVM) is characterised by abnormal shunting between cerebral arteries and veins without going through capillaries. Instead the blood goes through a collection of small vessels from arteries to veins. These collection of abnormal small vessels is termed as "nidus". This condition happens in 0.1% of the population has a risk of 2 to 4% per year for intracranial bleeding. Once ruptured, it results in intraparenchymal hemorrhage, intraventricular hemorrhage and SAH. Rupture of cerebral AVM often occurs in young people and children. Cerebral AVM can be diagnosed by computed tomography angiography (CTA) brain, magnetic resonance angiography (MRA) brain, or digital subtraction angiography (DSA). DSA is important to determine whether there is nidal or perinidal aneurysm.

=== Dural arteriovenous fistulae ===
Dural arteriovenous fistulae (DAVF) is the direct connection between dural or cerebral arteries with dural venous sinuses or cortical veins. It accounts for 10 to 15% of intracranial arteriovenous shunts. DAVF lacks a nidus. Signs and symptoms of DAVF are: headache, tinnitus, neurological deficits involving cranial nerves, and increased intracranial pressure. DAVF once ruptured, will produce intraparenchymal hemorrhage or SAH. Increase in number of vessels near dural venous sinuses as seen on CTA is suggestive of DVAF. 4DCT may increase the sensitivity of detecting DAVF. In MRI scans, susceptibility weighted imaging (SWI) and arterial spin labelling sequences (labelling protons in blood without the use of contrast media to determine blood flow) are useful in evaluating DAVF. The patterns of draining veins from the fistula determines the risk of DAVF rupture. Increased pressure within the dural venous sinuses causes backpressure into the cortical veins, thus making cortical veins more prone to rupture. The risk of hemorrhage is graded by Cognard and Borden grading systems. These grading systems are based upon the DSA.

=== Cortical venous and cerebral venous sinus thrombosis ===
Dural venous sinus thrombosis (DVST) and cortical venous thrombosis (CVT) commonly presents with headache, increased intracranial pressure, or seizures. DVST is more common than CVT. DVST are frequently caused by infections in the skull base, dehydration, thrombophilia, meningioma, and other dural tumours. On CT scans, brain parenchymal hemorrhage that does not confined to specific arterial territory along with hyperdense appearance on dural venous sinuses raises the suspicion of DVST. Further evaluation with CT venography, MR venography, and post gadolinium MRI provides accurate diagnosis of venous thrombosis and follow-up after treatment. These studies demonstrate thrombus as filling defect or lack of signal.

=== Vasculitis and vasculopathy ===
Those with vasculitis may be presented with headache, behavioural changes, neurological deficits, or intracranial bleeding. Sulcal SAH is the most common form of intracranial bleed caused by vasculitis. On CT scans, sulcal SAH is seen as hyperdensity within the cerebral sulcus, while on MRI, it is seen as hyperintensity on FLAIR sequence, and hypointensity on GRE/SWI sequence. DSA is important in making the diagnosis of vasculitis or vasculopathy.

=== Mycotic aneurysm ===
It is arterial outpouchings arise from distal cerebral arteries. These are pseudoaneurysm, caused by thrombus clogging the distal arteries, which results in inflammation and small tears at the site of occlusion. These inflammation and thrombis can caused by infective endocarditis, artificial heart valve or other heart problems. Similar to vasculitis, rupture of mycotic aneurysm also causes SAH in cerebral sulci, mostly located in the vertex. If mycotic aneurysm is located more proximally, it will produce diffuse SAH pattern. CTA or MRA would produce focal outpouching or increase in diameter of the vessel. Meanwhile, GRE/SWI MRI sequence would produce focal hypointensity. Small mycotic aneurysms are difficult to be seen on CT or MRI. Thus, DSA is useful in identifying these lesions.

== Management ==
For those who is already on blood thinners such as aspirin or clopidogrel for prevention of myocardial infarction or stroke, traumatic intracranial hemorrhage should prompt the use of platelet function assays (PFA-100) to assess the effect of these antiplalelet agents. After that, plateletpheresis can be started to increase the aggregation of platelets, thus stopping the intracranial bleed. In those with impaired kidney functions, desmopressin or cryoprecipitate can be used instead.

From limited observational data, it may be relatively safe to restart blood thinners after an ICH as it is associated with reduced thromboembolic complications with similar risk of recurrent hemorrhage when compared to those did not start blood thinners after an ICH.

== Comparison ==
Comparison of epidural and subdural hematomas
Compared quality	Epidural	Subdural
Location	Between the skull and the inner meningeal layer of the dura mater or between outer endosteal and inner meningeal layer of dura mater	Between the meningeal layers of dura mater and the Arachnoid mater
Involved vessel	Temperoparietal locus (most likely) – Middle meningeal artery Frontal locus – anterior ethmoidal artery Occipital locus – transverse or sigmoid sinuses Vertex locus – superior sagittal sinus	Bridging veins
Symptoms (depending on the severity)	Lucid interval followed by unconsciousness	Gradually increasing headache and confusion
CT scan appearance	Biconvex lens	Crescent-shaped
