= Intracranial aneurysm =

Ballooning or rupturing of a blood vessel in the brain

- Other names: Cerebral aneurysm, brain aneurysm
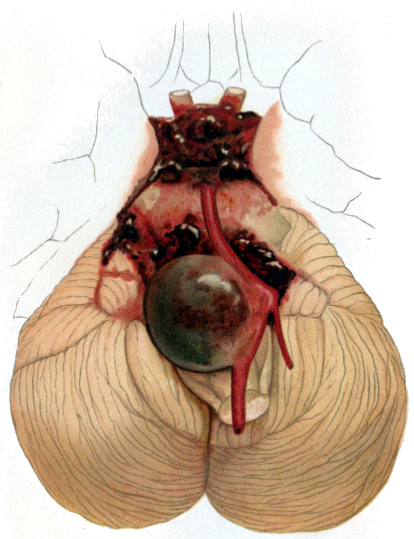
- Aneurysm of the basilar artery and the vertebral arteries
- Specialty: Interventional neuroradiology, neurosurgery, neurology
- Symptoms: None, severe headache, visual problems, nausea and vomiting, confusion
- Complications: Subarachnoid hemorrhage
- Usual onset: 30–60 years old
- Causes: Hypertension, infection, head trauma
- Risk factors: old age, family history, smoking, alcoholism, cocaine use
- Diagnostic method: Angiography, CT scan
- Treatment: Endovascular coiling, surgical clipping, cerebral bypass surgery, pipeline embolization
- Frequency: 2%

An intracranial aneurysm, also known as a cerebral aneurysm, is a cerebrovascular disorder in which weakness in the wall of a cerebral artery or vein causes a localized dilation or ballooning of the blood vessel.

Aneurysms in the posterior circulation (basilar artery, vertebral arteries and posterior communicating artery) have a higher risk of rupture. Basilar artery aneurysms represent only 3–5% of all intracranial aneurysms but are the most common aneurysms in the posterior circulation.

== Classification ==
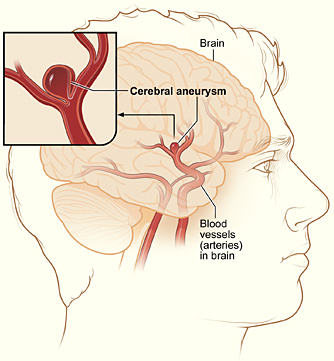
Diagram of cerebral aneurysm

Cerebral aneurysms are classified both by size and shape:

- Small aneurysms have a diameter of less than 15 mm.
- Larger aneurysms include those classified as large (15 to 25 mm), giant (25 to 50 mm) (0.98 inches to 1.97 inches), and super-giant (over 50 mm).

=== Berry (saccular) aneurysms ===
Saccular aneurysms, also known as berry aneurysms, appear as a round outpouching and are the most common form of cerebral aneurysm. Causes include connective tissue disorders, polycystic kidney disease, arteriovenous malformations, untreated hypertension, tobacco smoking, cocaine and amphetamines, intravenous drug abuse (can cause infectious mycotic aneurysms), alcoholism, heavy caffeine intake, head trauma, and infection in the arterial wall from bacteremia, i.e. mycotic aneurysms and related disorders.

=== Fusiform aneurysms ===
Fusiform dolichoectatic aneurysms represent a widening of a segment of an artery around the entire blood vessel, rather than just arising from a side of an artery's wall. They have an estimated annual risk of rupture of 1.6–1.9%.

=== Microaneurysms ===
Microaneurysms, also known as Charcot–Bouchard aneurysms, typically occur in small blood vessels (less than 300 micrometres in diameter), most often the lenticulostriate vessels of the basal ganglia, and are associated with chronic hypertension. Charcot–Bouchard aneurysms are a common cause of intracranial hemorrhage.

== Signs and symptoms ==
A small, unchanging aneurysm will produce few, if any, symptoms. Before a larger aneurysm ruptures, the individual may experience such symptoms as a sudden and unusually severe headache, nausea, vision impairment, vomiting, and loss of consciousness, or no symptoms at all.

=== Subarachnoid bleed ===
If an aneurysm ruptures, blood leaks into the space around the brain. This is called a subarachnoid hemorrhage. Onset is usually sudden without prodrome, classically presenting as a "thunderclap headache" worse than previous headaches. Symptoms of a subarachnoid hemorrhage differ depending on the site and size of the aneurysm. Symptoms of a ruptured aneurysm can include:

- a sudden severe headache that can last from several hours to days
- nausea and vomiting
- drowsiness, confusion and/or loss of consciousness
- visual abnormalities
- meningism
- dizziness

Almost all aneurysms rupture at their apex. This leads to hemorrhage in the subarachnoid space and sometimes in brain parenchyma. Minor leakage from aneurysm may precede rupture, causing warning headaches. About 60% of patients die immediately after rupture. Larger aneurysms have a greater tendency to rupture, though most ruptured aneurysms are less than 10 mm in diameter.

=== Microaneurysms ===
A ruptured microaneurysm may cause an intracerebral hemorrhage, presenting as a focal neurological deficit.

Rebleeding, hydrocephalus (the excessive accumulation of cerebrospinal fluid), vasospasm (spasm, or narrowing, of the blood vessels), or multiple aneurysms may also occur. The risk of rupture from a cerebral aneurysm varies according to the size of an aneurysm, with the risk rising as the aneurysm size increases.

=== Vasospasm ===
Vasospasm, referring to blood vessel constriction, can occur secondary to subarachnoid hemorrhage following a ruptured aneurysm. This is most likely to occur within 21 days and is seen radiologically within 60% of such patients. The vasospasm is thought to be secondary to the apoptosis of inflammatory cells such as macrophages and neutrophils that become trapped in the subarachnoid space. These cells initially invade the subarachnoid space from the circulation in order to phagocytose the hemorrhaged red blood cells. Following apoptosis, it is thought there is a massive degranulation of vasoconstrictors, including endothelins and free radicals, that cause the vasospasm.

== Risk factors ==
Intracranial aneurysms may result from diseases acquired during life, or from genetic conditions. Hypertension, smoking, alcoholism, and obesity are associated with the development of brain aneurysms. Cocaine use has also been associated with the development of intracranial aneurysms.

Other acquired associations with intracranial aneurysms include head trauma and infections.

=== Genetic associations ===
Coarctation of the aorta is also a known risk factor, as is arteriovenous malformation. Genetic conditions associated with connective tissue disease may also be associated with the development of aneurysms. This includes:

- autosomal dominant polycystic kidney disease,
- neurofibromatosis type I,
- Marfan syndrome,
- multiple endocrine neoplasia type I,
- pseudoxanthoma elasticum,
- hereditary hemorrhagic telangiectasia and
- Ehlers–Danlos syndrome types II and IV.

Specific genes have also had reported association with the development of intracranial aneurysms, including perlecan, elastin, collagen type 1 A2, endothelial nitric oxide synthase, endothelin receptor A and cyclin dependent kinase inhibitor. Recently, several genetic loci have been identified as relevant to the development of intracranial aneurysms. These include 1p34–36, 2p14–15, 7q11, 11q25, and 19q13.1–13.3.

== Pathophysiology ==
Aneurysm means an outpouching of a blood vessel wall that is filled with blood. Aneurysms occur at a point of weakness in the vessel wall. This can be because of acquired disease or hereditary factors. The repeated trauma of blood flow against the vessel wall presses against the point of weakness and causes the aneurysm to enlarge. As described by the law of Young-Laplace, the increasing area increases tension against the aneurysmal walls, leading to enlargement. In addition, a combination of computational fluid dynamics and morphological indices have been proposed as reliable predictors of cerebral aneurysm rupture.

Both high and low wall shear stress of flowing blood can cause aneurysms and rupture. However, the mechanism of action is still unknown. It is speculated that low shear stress causes growth and rupture of large aneurysms through inflammatory response while high shear stress causes growth and rupture of small aneurysms through mural response (response from the blood vessel wall). Other risk factors that contribute to the formation of aneurysm are: cigarette smoking, hypertension, female gender, family history of cerebral aneurysm, infection, and trauma. Damage to structural integrity of the arterial wall by shear stress causes an inflammatory response with the recruitment of T cells, macrophages, and mast cells. The inflammatory mediators are: interleukin 1 beta, interleukin 6, tumor necrosis factor alpha (TNF alpha), MMP1, MMP2, MMP9, prostaglandin E2, complement system, reactive oxygen species (ROS), and angiotensin II. However, smooth muscle cells from the tunica media layer of the artery moved into the tunica intima, where the function of the smooth muscle cells changed from contractile function into pro-inflammatory function. This causes the fibrosis of the arterial wall, with reduction of number of smooth muscle cells, abnormal collagen synthesis, resulting in a thinning of the arterial wall and the formation of aneurysm and rupture. No specific gene loci has been identified to be associated with cerebral aneurysms.

Generally, aneurysms larger than 7 mm in diameter should be treated because they are prone for rupture. Meanwhile, aneurysms less than 7 mm arise from the anterior and posterior communicating artery and are more easily ruptured when compared to aneurysms arising from other locations.

=== Saccular aneurysms ===
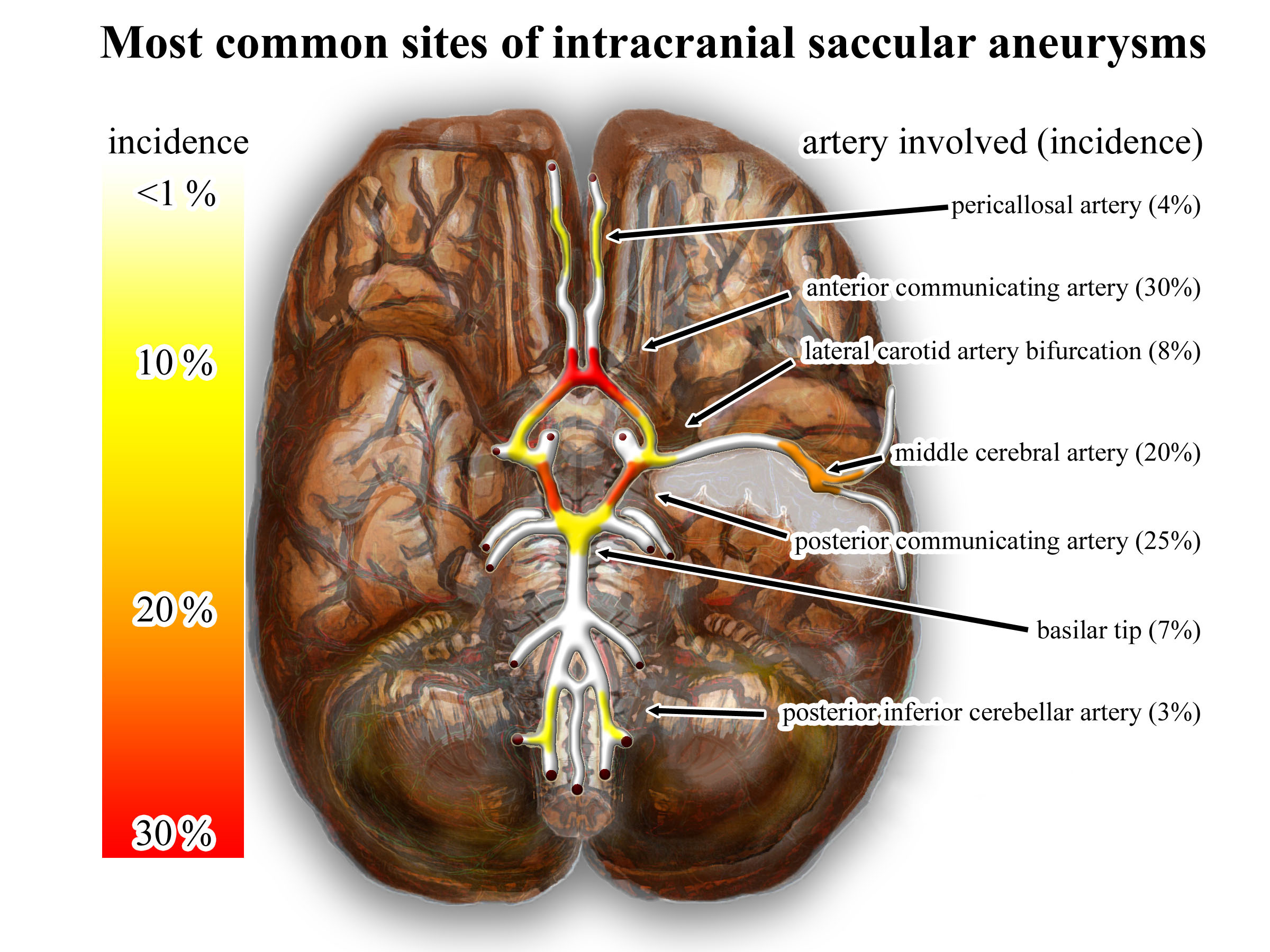
The most common sites of intracranial saccular aneurysms

Saccular aneurysms are almost always the result of hereditary weaknesses in blood vessels and typically occur within the arteries of the circle of Willis, in order of frequency affecting the following arteries:

- Anterior communicating artery
- Posterior communicating artery
- Middle cerebral artery
- Internal carotid artery
- Tip of basilar artery

Saccular aneurysms tend to have a lack of tunica media and elastic lamina around their dilated locations (congenital), with a wall of sac made up of thickened hyalinized intima and adventitia. In addition, some parts of the brain vasculature are inherently weak—particularly areas along the circle of Willis, where small communicating vessels link the main cerebral vessels. These areas are particularly susceptible to saccular aneurysms. Approximately 25% of patients have multiple aneurysms, predominantly when there is a familial pattern.

== Diagnosis ==
CT angiography showing aneurysm measuring 2.6 mm in diameter at the ACOM (anterior communicating artery).

Once suspected, intracranial aneurysms can be diagnosed radiologically using magnetic resonance or CT angiography. But these methods have limited sensitivity for diagnosis of small aneurysms, and often cannot be used to specifically distinguish them from infundibular dilations without performing a formal angiogram. The determination of whether an aneurysm is ruptured is critical to diagnosis. Lumbar puncture (LP) is the gold standard technique for determining aneurysm rupture (subarachnoid hemorrhage). Once an LP is performed, the CSF is evaluated for RBC count, and presence or absence of xanthochromia.

== Treatment ==
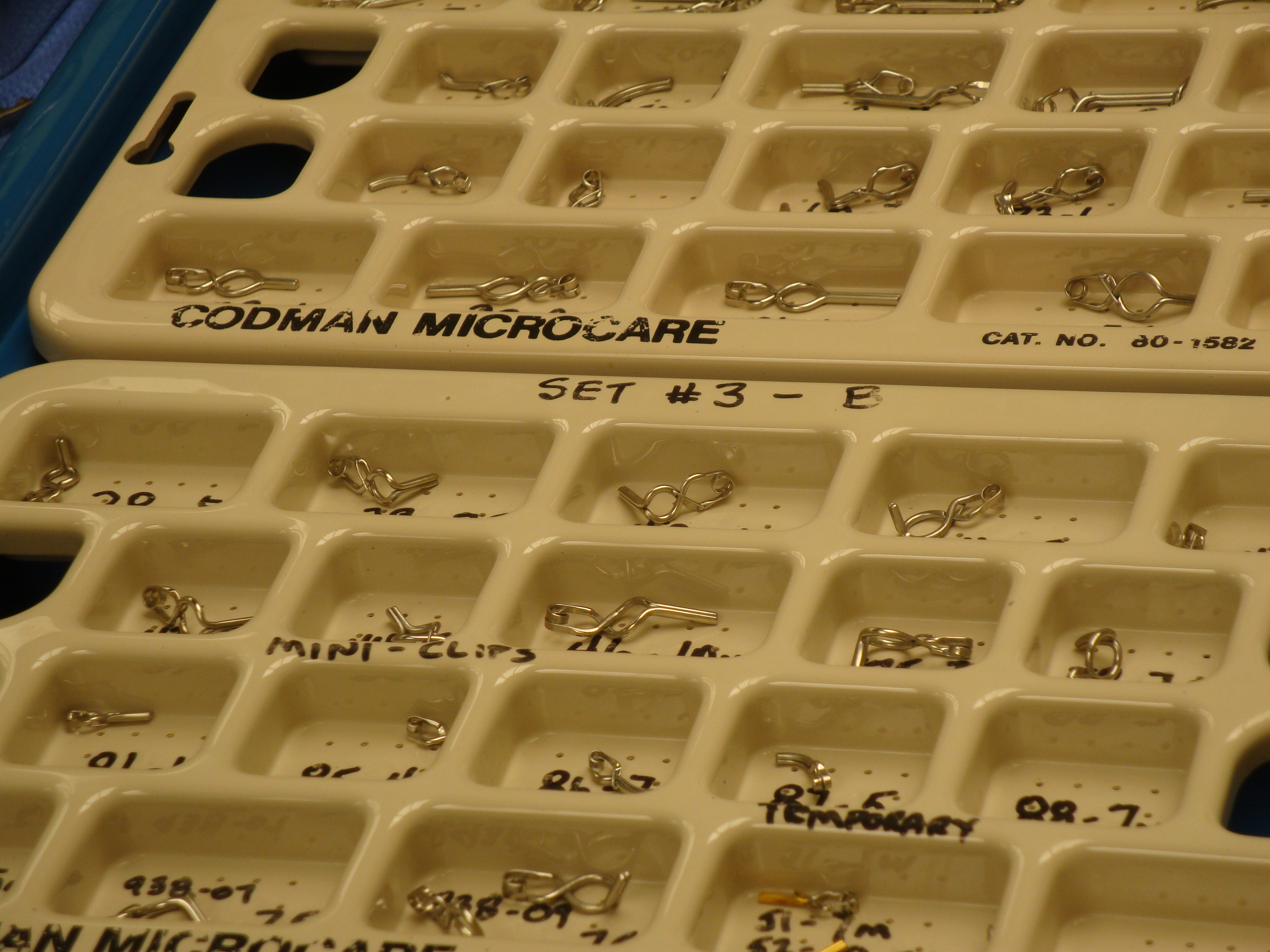
A selection of Mayfield and Drake aneurysm clips ready for implantation

Emergency treatment for individuals with a ruptured cerebral aneurysm generally includes restoring deteriorating respiration and reducing intracranial pressure. Currently there are two treatment options for securing intracranial aneurysms: surgical clipping or endovascular coiling. If possible, either surgical clipping or endovascular coiling is typically performed within the first 24 hours after bleeding to occlude the ruptured aneurysm and reduce the risk of recurrent hemorrhage.

While a large meta-analysis found the outcomes and risks of surgical clipping and endovascular coiling to be statistically similar, no consensus has been reached. In particular, the large randomised control trial International Subarachnoid Aneurysm Trial appears to indicate a higher rate of recurrence when intracerebral aneurysms are treated using endovascular coiling. Analysis of data from this trial has indicated a 7% lower eight-year mortality rate with coiling, a high rate of aneurysm recurrence in aneurysms treated with coiling—from 28.6 to 33.6% within a year, a 6.9 times greater rate of late retreatment for coiled aneurysms, and a rate of rebleeding 8 times higher than surgically clipped aneurysms.

=== Surgical clipping ===
Aneurysms can be treated by clipping the base of the aneurysm with a specially designed clip. Whilst this is typically carried out by craniotomy, a new endoscopic endonasal approach is being trialed. Surgical clipping was introduced by Walter Dandy of the Johns Hopkins Hospital in 1937. After clipping, a catheter angiogram or CTA can be performed to confirm complete clipping.

=== Endovascular coiling ===
Endovascular coiling refers to the insertion of platinum coils into the aneurysm. A catheter is inserted into a blood vessel, typically the femoral artery, and passed through blood vessels into the cerebral circulation and the aneurysm. Coils are pushed into the aneurysm, or released into the blood stream ahead of the aneurysm. Upon depositing within the aneurysm, the coils expand and initiate a thrombotic reaction within the aneurysm. If successful, this prevents further bleeding from the aneurysm. In the case of broad-based aneurysms, a stent may be passed first into the parent artery to serve as a scaffold for the coils.

=== Cerebral bypass surgery ===
Cerebral bypass surgery was developed in the 1960s in Switzerland by Gazi Yaşargil. When a patient has an aneurysm involving a blood vessel or a tumor at the base of the skull wrapping around a blood vessel, surgeons eliminate the problem vessel by replacing it with an artery from another part of the body.

== Prognosis ==
Outcomes depend on the size of the aneurysm. Small aneurysms (less than 7 mm) have a low risk of rupture and increase in size slowly. The risk of rupture is less than one percent for aneurysms of this size.

The prognosis for a ruptured cerebral aneurysm depends on the extent and location of the aneurysm, the person's age, general health, and neurological condition. Some individuals with a ruptured cerebral aneurysm die from the initial bleeding. Other individuals with cerebral aneurysm recover with little or no neurological deficit. The most significant factors in determining outcome are the Hunt and Hess grade, and age. Generally, patients with Hunt and Hess grade I and II hemorrhage on admission to the emergency room and patients who are younger within the typical age range of vulnerability can anticipate a good outcome, without death or permanent disability. Older patients and those with poorer Hunt and Hess grades on admission have a poor prognosis. Generally, about two-thirds of patients have a poor outcome, death, or permanent disability.

Increased availability and greater access to medical imaging has caused a rising number of asymptomatic, unruptured cerebral aneurysms to be discovered incidentally during medical imaging investigations. Unruptured aneurysms may be managed by endovascular clipping or stenting. For those subjects that underwent follow-up for the unruptured aneurysm, computed tomography angiography (CTA) or magnetic resonance angiography (MRA) of the brain can be done yearly. Recently, an increasing number of aneurysm features have been evaluated in their ability to predict aneurysm rupture status, including aneurysm height, aspect ratio, height-to-width ratio, inflow angle, deviations from ideal spherical or elliptical forms, and radiomics morphological features.

== Epidemiology ==
The prevalence of intracranial aneurysm is about 1–5% (10 million to 12 million persons in the United States) and the incidence is 1 per 10,000 persons per year in the United States (approximately 27,000), with 30- to 60-year-olds being the age group most affected. Intracranial aneurysms occur more in women, by a ratio of 3 to 2, and are rarely seen in pediatric populations.

== Clinical trials ==
=== International Subarachnoid Aneurysm Trial ===
The International Subarachnoid Aneurysm Trial (ISAT) was a large multicenter prospective randomized clinical medical trial comparing the safety and efficacy of endovascular coil treatment and surgical clipping for the treatment of brain aneurysms. The study began in 1994 with the first results being published in The Lancet in 2002, and the 10-year data were published again in The Lancet in early September 2005. A total of 2,143 study participants were mostly drawn from U.K. hospitals, with the rest drawn from North American and European hospitals.

The study found superior results with endovascular coil treatment compared to surgical clipping. However, subsequent studies have questioned this conclusion. The study was criticized by many clinicians and was not accepted by most surgeons. Primary criticisms were related to the study's generalizability and the long-term prognosis of coil embolization.

==== Study design and results ====
ISAT sought to measure outcomes of cerebral aneurysm patients at 2 and 12 months using a type of Rankin scale. The study was prematurely terminated in 2002 after the oversight committee determined there was increased morbidity with surgical clipping compared to endovascular coiling.

==== Criticism ====
ISAT was criticized on several factors related to the randomization of the patient population. The randomized patient population in the ISAT was younger on average; the majority had aneurysms under 10 mm and in anterior circulation compared to the population of subarachnoid hemorrhage patients in the U.S. and Japan. In response to these criticisms, a facility that participated in ISAT compared the clinical outcomes of their patients who were not selected for the study to those who were. They reported similar outcomes to the ISAT.

==== Subsequent analysis ====
Although the initial ISAT analysis appeared to favor endovascular coiling over microsurgical clipping, subsequent meta-analysis have questioned that conclusion finding higher incidence of recurrence. A large meta-analysis from Johns Hopkins University published in Neurosurgery concluded that "there is no clear consensus in these two studies or in the 45 observational studies included."

Updated data from the ISAT group in March 2008 shows that the higher aneurysm rate of recurrence is also associated with a higher re-bleeding rate, given that the re-bleed rate of coiled aneurysms appears to be 8 times higher than that of aneurysms treated with surgical clipping in this study. The ISAT authors conclude that "when treating ruptured cerebral aneurysms, the advantage of coil embolization over clip ligation cannot be assumed for patients younger than 40 years old." Other studies have directly questioned the ISAT's conclusions. This conclusion is based on a number of methodological assumptions itself and other authors have cautioned about extending it to other patient populations.

== See also ==
- Interventional neuroradiology
- Intradural pseudoaneurysm
