= Frank Mayfield =

Frank Mayfield may refer to:

- Frank H. Mayfield (born 1939), member of the Ohio House of Representatives
- Frank Henderson Mayfield (1908–1991), American neurosurgeon
