= Familial Danish dementia =

- Other names: FDD, ADan amyloidosis, Heredopathia ophthalmootoencephalica, HOOE, ITM2B amyloidosis, Cerebellar ataxia, cataract, deafness, and dementia or psychosis
- Specialty: Neurology
- Symptoms: Cataracts, Deafness, Progressive ataxia, Dementia,
- Usual onset: 20-30 years old
- Causes: Mutations of the BRI2 gene
- Diagnostic method: Family history, symptoms, and genetic testing

Familial Danish dementia is an extremely rare, neurodegenerative disease characterized by progressive cataracts, loss of hearing, cerebellar ataxia, paranoid psychosis, and dementia. Neuropathological hallmarks include extensive atrophy of all areas of the brain, chronic diffuse encephalopathy, and the presence of exceedingly thin and nearly totally demyelinated cranial nerves.

FDD is an autosomal dominant disorder caused by a mutation in the BRI2 gene on chromosome 13. FDD is one of the two types of hereditary, cerebral amyloid angiopathy, alongside familial British dementia.

== Signs and symptoms ==
Vision problems are one of the earliest symptoms of FDD with cataracts usually appearing before age 30. However, the development of cataracts can appear as early as age 20. The median age for visual symptoms is 27. Other ocular disorders including hemorrhages can also be present.

Impaired hearing manifests as severe or total perceptive loss of hearing and typically presents 10 to 20 years after the onset of ocular symptoms, whereas cerebellar ataxia appears soon after the age of 40.

In most cases, paranoid psychosis occurs after the age of 50, followed by dementia. The majority of patients die in their fifties or sixties.

FDD patients also have extensive brain atrophy, particularly in the cerebellum, cerebral cortex, and white matter, as well as very thin and virtually demyelinated cranial nerves.

Cerebral amyloid angiopathy in this disorder is severe. CAA is present in all regions of the central nervous system.

Other symptoms include intention tremor, neurofibrillary tangles, spasticity, apathy, hyperorality, early dyscalculia, and stereotyped behavior.

== Causes ==
FDD is caused by a 10-nucleotide duplication prior to the stop codon of the BRI2/ITM2B gene. In healthy people, BRI2 is produced as an immature type-II membrane protein (imBRI2), which is cleaved at the C-terminus by a pro-protein convertase to create mature BRI2 (mBRI2) and a 23aa soluble C-terminal fragment (Bri23). However, in FDD patients, a longer C-terminal fragment, the ADan peptide, is formed from the Danish mutant protein (BRI2-ADan), which exhibits amyloidogenic features. ADan causes amyloid angiopathy in the cerebrum, choroid plexus, cerebellum, spinal cord, and retinas.

Mutations in Cystatin C have also been suggested to be a cause of the disorder.

== Diagnosis ==
Due to the rarity of FDD, it is usually diagnosed based on family history and symptoms. Mutations in the BRI2 gene can be identified by genetic testing.

FDD shares similar neuropathological characteristics with Alzheimer disease, including extensive cerebrovascular amyloidosis, parenchymal amyloid and preamyloid lesions, and neurofibrillary degeneration. Surprisingly, a detailed anti-Aβ immunohistochemical survey of various brain areas from all available FDD autopsy cases clearly identified a co-deposited with ADan primarily in vascular and perivascular amyloid lesions, although co-deposition was also found on a smaller scale in parenchymal preamyloid deposits.

Differential diagnosis includes Begger syndrome and Refsum disease.

== Prognosis ==
Most people with this condition die when they reach their fifties or sixties, with the median age of death being 58. The most common cause of death in FDD is complications from pneumonia, diarrhea, and strokes.

== Epidemiology ==
Familial Danish Dementia has been reported in a single family spanning three generations, with there being nine reported cases as of 2014. Males and females are equally affected by the disorder.

== History ==
In 1970, Strömgren et al. first described Familial Danish Dementia as heredopathia opthalmo-oto-encephalica. It was discovered in 9 members of a Danish family spanning three generations.

Histopathologically FDD was characterized by severe cerebral amyloid angiopathy with neurofibrillary tangle deposition in the limbic system and the neocortex. It is also neuropathologically characterized by diffuse atrophy of cerebellum, cranial nerves, and the spinal cord.
