= Cerebral amyloid angiopathy =

Disease of blood vessels of the brain

- Other names: Congophilic angiopathy
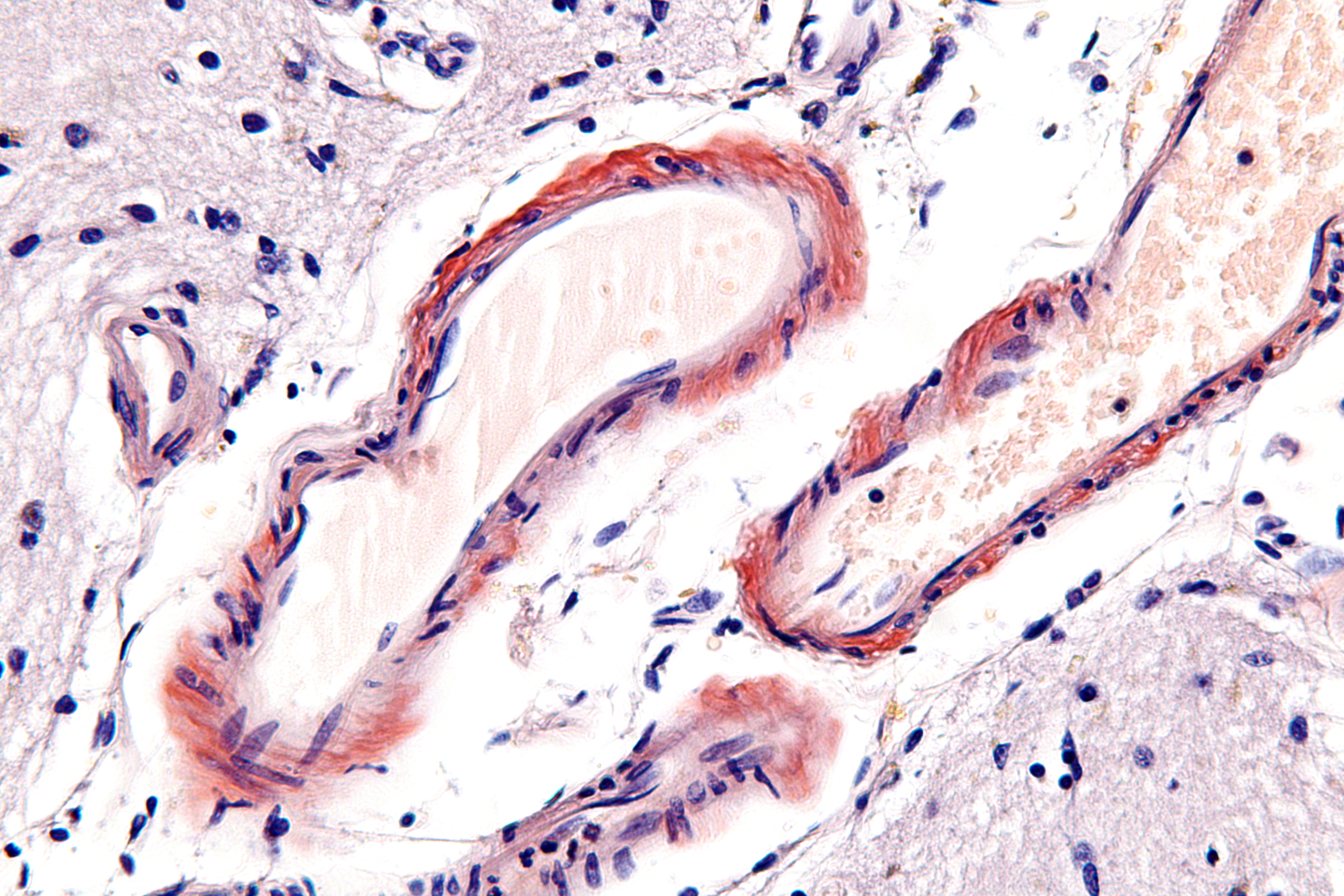
- Micrograph of cerebral amyloid angiopathy using congo red stain
- Specialty: Neurology
- Causes: Cause of CAA is unknown
- Diagnostic method: PET scan, CT scan
- Treatment: Management can be physical, occupational, or speech therapy.
- Frequency: 0.0001%

Cerebral amyloid angiopathy (CAA) is a form of angiopathy (disease of the blood vessels) in which specific proteins deposit in the walls of small to medium-sized blood vessels of the brain and meninges (lining of the brain). The term congophilic angiopathy is sometimes used because the presence of the abnormal aggregations of amyloid can be demonstrated by microscopic examination of brain tissue after staining with the dye Congo red. The amyloid material is only found in the brain and as such the disease is not related to other forms of amyloidosis.

Amyloid β (Aβ) is the specific type of amyloidogenic protein that deposits in the arterial walls in the most common form of CAA. The amyloid deposits replace the muscular layer in the arterial walls, weakening the walls, and leading to inflammation and brain bleeds (hemorrhagic strokes) or microbleeds many years later (about 30-40 years after the deposits begin based on limited studies). Therefore symptomatic disease is usually seen in older adults. Since Aβ is the same amyloidogenic protein that is associated with Alzheimer's disease, CAA and brain bleeds are more common in people with Alzheimer's disease. Diagnosis of CAA is based on signs and symptoms along with brain imaging such as magnetic resonance imaging. Treatment for brain bleeds related to CAA is the same as other causes of brain bleeds (not due to CAA). Controlling blood pressure may lower the incidence of re-bleeds.

== Types ==
CAA is most often associated with the accumulation of amyloid beta (Aβ); however, less common familial subtypes involving other misfolded proteins also exist:

- The "Icelandic type" of CAA is associated with cystatin C amyloid (ACys).
- The "British type" and "Danish type" CAA are associated with British amyloid (ABri) and Danish amyloid (ADan), respectively. Both peptides are linked to mutations in ITM2B.
- Familial amyloidosis-"Finnish" type CAA is associated with gelsolin amyloid (AGel).
- Some prion diseases exhibit CAA caused by deposition of the prion protein.

== Signs and symptoms ==
CAA is associated with brain hemorrhages, particularly microhemorrhages. The accumulation of microbleeds over many years may lead to cognitive impairment and dementia in those with CAA. The location of the cerebral microbleed determines whether it is more likely to have been caused by hypertension or CAA. A population based study using amyloid PET imaging in an Asian population with cerebral amyloid angiopathy–intracerebral hemorrhage noted that superficial cerebellar microbleeds are related to CAA, whereas deep or mixed-location cerebellar microbleeds are more likely related to hypertension.

In other instances the bleeding can be acute and much larger, with the bleeding within the brain usually being confined to a particular lobe. This is different from other types of brain bleeds in which the bleeding usually spans different lobes. The symptoms that result (such as weakness or loss of sensation) depend on the area of the brain affected by the bleeding. CAA usually affects blood vessels of the superficial cerebral cortex and leptomeninges lining the brain, sparing deeper gray matter brain strucutures, so the area of the cortical bleed corresponds to the signs and symptoms.

A less common presentation of CAA involves transient neurological symptoms (weakness, loss of sensation) affecting certain parts of the body, with symptoms typically lasting less than 30 minutes and often recurring over the next days to weeks. The symptoms are similar to a transient ischemic attack (TIA), but unlike a TIA the symptoms may spread to contiguous body parts over minutes, and are associated with changes related to bleeding on brain imaging.

== Causes ==
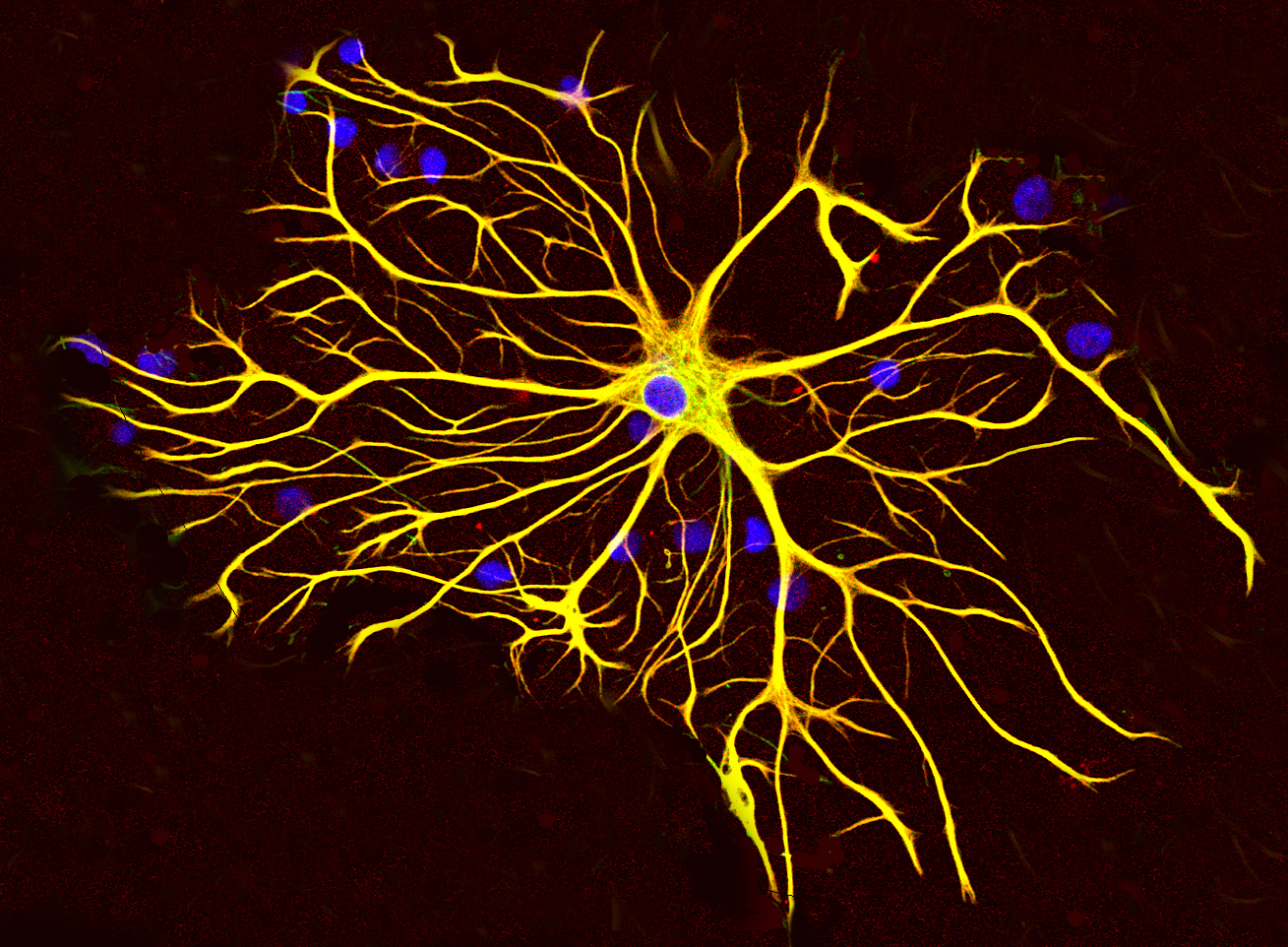
Astrocyte

Aβ-type CAA occurs either sporadically (generally in elderly populations) or in familial forms caused by genetic mutations such as the "Flemish", "Iowa", and "Dutch" mutations. In familial forms of CAA, Aβ buildup is likely due to increased production rather than poor clearance. Mutations in the amyloid precursor protein (APP), Presenilin (PS) 1 and PS2 genes can result in increased rates of cleavage of the APP into Aβ. CAA occurring in the Flemish type has been linked to large dense-core Aβ plaques in the brain. Apolipoprotein E (APOE) subtypes ε2 and ε4 are associated with an increased probability of getting cerebral amyloid angiopathy. An immune mechanism has also been proposed as a causative factor.

The reason for the deposition of Aβ in sporadic CAA is still unclear, with both increased production of the peptide and abnormal clearance having been proposed as potential causes. Under normal physiology, Aβ is cleared from the brain by four pathways: (1) endocytosis by astrocytes and microglial cells, (2) enzymatic degradation by neprilysin or insulysin (3) clearance by way of the blood–brain barrier or (4) drainage along periarterial spaces. Abnormalities in each of these clearance pathways have been linked to CAA.

Very rare cases of iatrogenic CAA have occurred in people who had been exposed to biologic therapeutics that had been contaminated with prion-like seeds of Aβ. The biologic materials, which are no longer in use, included growth hormone and dura mater patches that had been sourced from human cadavers.

== Pathophysiology ==
Micrographs of Type 2 (left) and Type 1 (right) CAA stained using an antibody to Aβ. Arrowheads show arterioles in the cortical parenchyma (black) and a sulcus (grey); arrow shows a capillary. Scale bar=100 microns (0.1 mm).

The amyloid deposits in cerebral amyloid angiopathy and those forming Aβ plaques in Alzheimer's disease both consist of Aβ; however the Aβ in CAA consists mainly of the shorter 40-amino acid form of the protein (Aβ40), whereas plaques more frequently contain both Aβ40 and Aβ42. It is common for people to have features of both diseases (Alzheimer's dementia and CAA, with both types of Aβ amyloid deposition). In CAA, Aβ accumulates in the arterial and capillary walls of the brain (but not in blood vessels in the rest of the body), whereas cerebral veins, venules, and large arteries are generally spared. CAA most often affects arterioles supplying the outer cortex of the brain and the leptomeninges, but vessels in deeper gray matter structures such as the thalamus, basal ganglia, and brainstem are not affected.

CAA begins with amyloid replacing the muscular tissue of the tunica media layer of the arteriolar walls. As the disease progresses, amyloid deposits eventually penetrate the entire vessel wall and cause damage and splitting of the vessel wall. This splitting and the influx of inflammatory cells cause blood vessel leakage and bleeding characteristic of CAA. Studies involving familial forms of CAA show that amyloid deposits begin 30-40 years before bleeding events occur, with impaired cerebral function as arterioles become less responsive to physiologic signals from the brain occurring 20-30 years prior to the first bleeding events.

The vascular amyloid pathology characteristic of CAA can be classified as either Type 1 or Type 2, the latter type being more common. In Type 1 CAA, amyloid deposits occur within cortical capillaries as well as within leptomeningeal and cortical arteries, arterioles, veins, and venules. In type 2 CAA, amyloid deposits are present in leptomeningeal and cortical arteries and arterioles but rarely if at all in capillaries. Deposits in veins or venules are possible in either type, but they are far less prevalent than are arteriolar lesions.

== Diagnosis ==
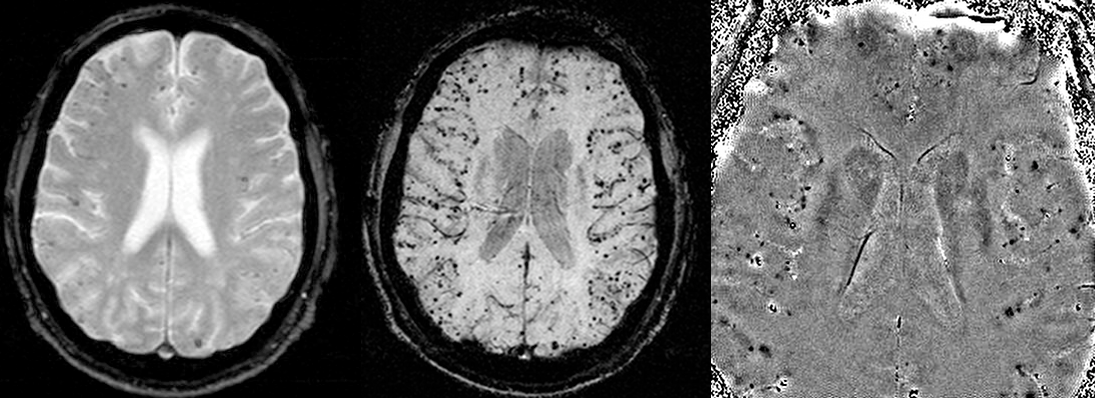
MRI showing low signal foci in cerebral amyloid angiopathy. Conventional gradient echo T2*-weighted image (left, TE=20ms), susceptibility weighted image (SWI), and SWI phase image (center and right, respectively, TE=40ms) at 1.5 tesla.

Diagnosis of CAA in living patients is improving, but definitive diagnosis requires examination of the brain at autopsy. In rare cases, biopsy can play a role in diagnosing probable cases. When no tissue is available for microscopic examination, the Boston criteria are used to determine probable CAA based on brain imaging findings using MRI or CT scans. When MRI is used, the Boston Criteria for diagnosis include evidence of lobar hemorrhage and/or cortical microbleeds, cortical superficial siderosis, and often a characteristic non-bleed sign such as spotty white matter hyperintensities.

=== Imaging ===
Cerebral amyloid angiopathy can present with lobar intracerebral hemorrhage or microbleeds in the brain. The bleeding usually occurs on the surfaces of the brain in contrast with intracranial haemorrhage due to high blood pressure, which occurs in deep locations of the brain such as basal ganglia and pons. In a lobar intracerebral bleed, CT scan would show a hyperdense haemorrhage area and hypodense edema around the hemorrhagic site. MRI sequences of gradient echo and susceptibility weighted imaging (SWI) are useful in detecting microbleeds and deposition of iron on the brain cortex (cortical superficial siderosis). Other MRI indicators of CAA include white matter hyperintensities and cortical thinning.

== Management ==
Since there is no cure for cerebral amyloid angiopathy, the aim is to control the symptoms of brain bleeds. Physical, occupational, and/or speech therapy may be helpful in the management of this condition.

Neurosurgical treatments for brain bleeds (for causes other than CAA) are also used to treat large brain bleeds due to CAA. No treatment is used for microbleeds due to CAA (microbleeds typically being less than 10 mm in diameter). The use of antiplatelet and anticoagulant therapy increases the risk of intracerebral hemorrhage in people with CAA. Controlling high blood pressure in those with hypertension and avoidance of alcohol may lower the risk of recurrent bleeding.

== History ==
Gustav Oppenheim was the first to report amyloid deposits in the vasculature of the central nervous system in 1909. The first paper focusing solely on what would come to be known as CAA was published in 1938 by WZ Scholz. In 1979, H. Okazaki published a paper implicating CAA in certain cases of lobar intracerebral hemorrhage. The Boston Criteria for CAA originated in a 1995 paper from Harvard Medical School.

== CAA in nonhuman animals ==
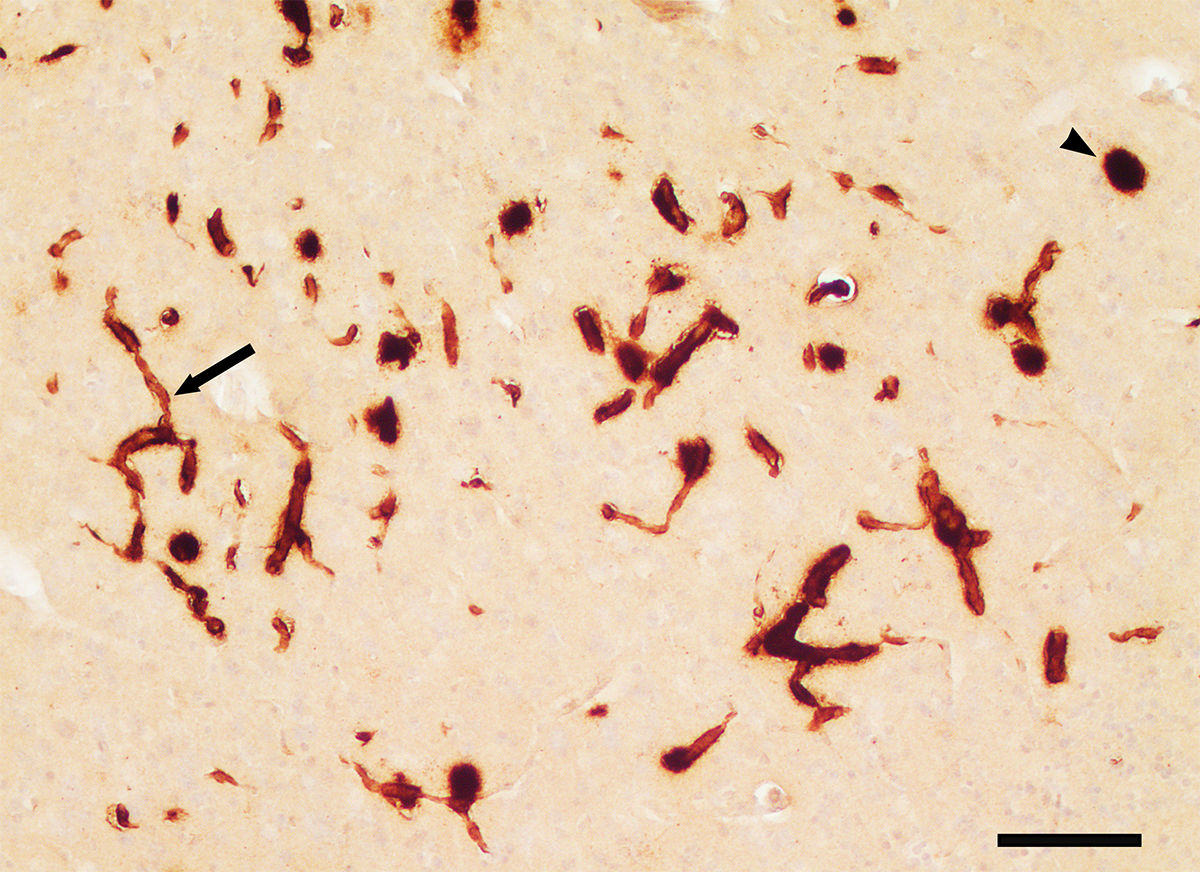
Micrograph of CAA (arrow) in the neocortex of an aged squirrel monkey (arrowhead indicates an Aβ plaque). Aβ immunostain; Bar=100 microns (0.1 mm).

Cerebral Aβ-amyloid angiopathy develops with age in several nonhuman species, including primates, dogs, cats, and other vertebrates. Among nonhuman primates, CAA has been documented in prosimians, New World monkeys, Old World monkeys and great apes. In older squirrel monkeys, CAA can be abundant, particularly in capillaries, although larger vessels also are involved. In one aged squirrel monkey, CAA has been associated with amyloid-related imaging abnormalities (ARIA). Mice and rats don't naturally manifest CAA, but several genetically modified rodent models have been generated that develop CAA as they age.
