= Lucid interval =

Temporary period of lucidity after a traumatic brain injury

In emergency medicine, a lucid interval is a temporary improvement in a patient's condition after a traumatic brain injury, after which the condition deteriorates. A lucid interval is especially indicative of an epidural hematoma. An estimated 20 to 50% of patients with epidural hematoma experience such a lucid interval.

== Description ==
When related to haemorrhage, the lucid interval occurs after the patient is knocked out by the initial concussive force of the trauma and then temporarily recovers, before lapsing into unconsciousness again when bleeding causes the haematoma to expand past the extent for which the body can compensate. After the injury, the patient is momentarily dazed or knocked out, and then becomes relatively lucid for a period of time which can last minutes or hours. Thereafter there is rapid decline as the blood collects within the skull, causing a rise in intracranial pressure, which damages brain tissue. In addition, some patients may develop "pseudoaneurysms" after trauma which can eventually burst and bleed, a factor which might account for the delay in loss of consciousness.

Because a patient may have a lucid interval, any significant head trauma is regarded as a medical emergency and receives emergency medical treatment even if the patient is conscious.

Delayed cerebral edema, a very serious and potentially fatal condition in which the brain swells dramatically, may follow a lucid interval that occurs after a minor head trauma.

Lucid intervals may also occur in conditions other than traumatic brain injury, such as heat stroke and the postictal phase after a seizure in epileptic patients.

== See also ==
- Stroke
