= Familial British dementia =

- Specialty: Psychiatry

Familial British dementia is a form of dementia. It was first reported by Cecil Charles Worster-Drought in 1933 and is therefore also known as Worster-Drought syndrome. It is caused by a mutation in the ITM2B gene (also known as BRI2); a different mutation of the same gene causes the similar syndrome of familial Danish dementia. The combination of amyloid pathology and neurofibrillary tangles has led to comparison with the pathology of Alzheimer's disease.
