= Traumatic aortic rupture =

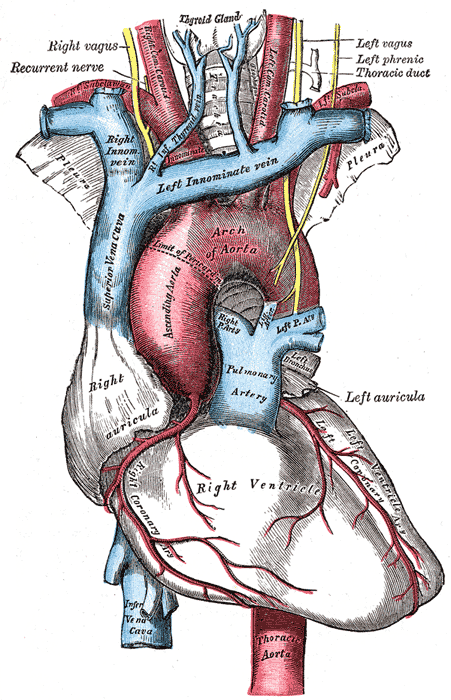
- The aorta, shown in red
- Specialty: Emergency medicine

Traumatic aortic rupture, also called traumatic aortic disruption or transection, is a condition in which the aorta, the largest artery in the body, is torn or ruptured as a result of trauma to the body. The condition is frequently fatal due to the profuse bleeding that results from the rupture. Since the aorta branches directly from the heart to supply blood to the rest of the body, the pressure within it is very great, and blood may be pumped out of a tear in the blood vessel very rapidly. This can quickly result in shock and death. Thus traumatic aortic rupture is a common killer in automotive accidents and other traumas, with up to 18% of deaths that occur in automobile collisions being related to the injury. In fact, aortic disruption due to blunt chest trauma is the second leading cause of injury death behind traumatic brain injury.

Aortic rupture can also be caused by non-traumatic mechanisms, particularly abdominal aortic aneurysm rupture.

== Symptoms and signs ==
Symptoms are often unreliable, but include severe tearing chest pain; cough; dyspnea (shortness of breath); dysphagia (difficulty swallowing); back pain; and hoarseness. Blood pressure is usually high in the upper body, but low in the lower body. A widened mediastinum and a massive left hemothorax are often found in an X-ray. There can be bruising of the anterior chest wall, and a systolic murmur can be heard on the bottom of the heart.

== Causes ==
The injury is usually caused by high speed impacts such as those that occur in vehicle collisions and serious falls. It may be due to different rates of deceleration of the heart and the aorta, which is in a fixed position.

== Location of rupture ==
By far the most common site for tearing in traumatic aortic rupture is the proximal descending aorta, near where the left subclavian artery branches off from the aorta. The tethering of the aorta by the ligamentum arteriosum makes the site prone to shearing forces during sudden deceleration.

A study of people who died after traumatic aortic rupture found that in 55–65% of cases the damage was at the aortic isthmus and in 10–14% it was in the ascending aorta or aortic arch. An angiogram will often show an irregular outpouching beyond the takeoff of the left subclavian artery at the aortic isthmus, representing an aortic pseudoaneurysm caused by the trauma. Damage can also be in the lower thoracic or abdominal aorta.

== Pathology ==
The aorta is not always torn completely through; it may also tear some but not all layers of the arterial wall, sometimes forming a false aneurysm. A sub-intimal hemorrhage is the least serious type.

=== Intimal tear ===
Being the mildest form, it often does not weaken the wall of the aorta and may heal on its own. Usually, it occurs in the descending aorta. It was originally defined as a small intimal flap with less than one centimeter length and with little or no haematoma. It is 10-28% of aortic injuries.

== Diagnosis ==
The condition is difficult to detect and may go unnoticed, because many patients have no specific symptoms. Diagnosis is further complicated by the fact that many patients with the injury experienced multiple other serious injuries as well, so the attention of hospital staff may be distracted from the possibility of aortic rupture. In fact most cases occur along with other injuries.

A common symptom is unusually high blood pressure in the upper body and very low blood pressure in lower limbs. Another sign is kidney failure where the creatinine level shoots very high and urine output becomes negligible. In most cases, however, the doctors would misinterpret kidney failure as due to issues with the kidney itself and may recommend dialysis.

Though not completely reliable, chest X-rays are the first-line investigation, initially used to diagnose this condition when the patient is unstable and cannot be sent to the CT bay. The preferred method of diagnosis used to be CT angiogram until it was found to cause complications in some people. As of 2013 it is reserved for when CT scans are inconclusive.

The classical findings on a chest X-ray will be widened mediastinum, apical cap, and displacement of the trachea, left main bronchus, or nasogastric tube. A normal chest x-ray does not exclude transection, but will diagnose conditions such as pneumothorax or hydrothorax. The aorta may also be torn at the point where it is connected to the heart. The aorta may be completely torn away from the heart, but patients with such injuries rarely survive very long after the injury; thus it is much more common for hospital staff to treat patients with partially torn aortas. When the aorta is partially torn, it may form a "pseudoaneurysm". In patients who do live long enough to be seen in a hospital, a majority have only a partially torn blood vessel, with the outermost adventitial layer still intact. In some of these patients, the adventitia and nearby structures within the chest may serve to prevent severe bleeding. After trauma, the aorta can be assessed by a CT angiogram or a direct angiogram, in which contrast is introduced into the aorta via a catheter.

== Treatment ==
=== Aortic transection ===
Traumatic aortic rupture is treated with surgery. However, morbidity and mortality rates for surgical repair of the aorta for this condition are among the highest of any cardiovascular surgery. For example, surgery is associated with a high rate of paraplegia, because the spinal cord is very sensitive to ischemia (lack of blood supply), and the nerve tissue can be damaged or killed by the interruption of the blood supply during surgery.

A less invasive option for treatment is endovascular repair, which does not require open thoracotomy and can be safer for people with other injuries to organs.

Since high blood pressure could exacerbate an incomplete tear in the aorta or even separate it completely from the heart, which would almost inevitably kill the patient, hospital staff take measures to keep the blood pressure low. Such measures include giving pain medication, keeping the patient calm, and avoiding procedures that could cause gagging or vomiting. Beta blockers and vasodilators can be given to lower the blood pressure, and intravenous fluids that might normally be given are foregone to avoid raising it.

In 1959, Passaro reported the first successful surgical repair of a torn aorta. Kirsh, in 1976, reported a 70% success rate in surgery to repair a torn aorta, based on 10 years of experience as a surgeon. Therefore, for those who make it to the hospital (85% do not), are successfully diagnosed in time and are quickly operated upon, the chances of survival are higher.

=== Intimal tear ===
In some cases, intimal tears may resolve on their own. Therefore, conservative treatment like antihypertensives are usually initiated. There is limited data on the treatment of this type of aortic injury. In some places, endovascular repair is also an option for treatment.

== Prognosis ==
Death occurs immediately after traumatic rupture of the thoracic aorta 75%–90% of the time since bleeding is so severe, and 80–85% of patients die before arriving at a hospital. Of those who live to reach a hospital, 23% die at the time of or shortly after arrival. In the US, an estimated 7,500–8,000 cases occur yearly, of which 1,000–1,500 make it to a hospital alive; these low numbers make it difficult to estimate the efficacy of surgical options. However, if surgery is performed in time, it can offer a chance of survival.

Though there is a concern that a small, stable tear in the aorta could enlarge and cause complete rupture of the aorta and heavy bleeding, this may be less common than previously believed as long as the blood pressure does not get too high.

There have been five rare cases of a traumatic aortic rupture going undiagnosed for more than a year, and presenting with chest and back pain. They had pseudoaneurysms or large aneurysms that caused pain. Asymptomatic chronic traumatic aneurysms are not always a risk for sudden death, unless they are too large. Growing aneurysms, symptomatic or not, have a risk of rupture, so the treatment is surgical removal.

== See also ==
- Chest trauma
- Aortic dissection
- Pulmonary contusion
