= Epidural hematoma =

Build-up of blood between the dura mater and skull

- Other names: Extradural hematoma, epidural hemorrhage, epidural haematoma, epidural bleeding
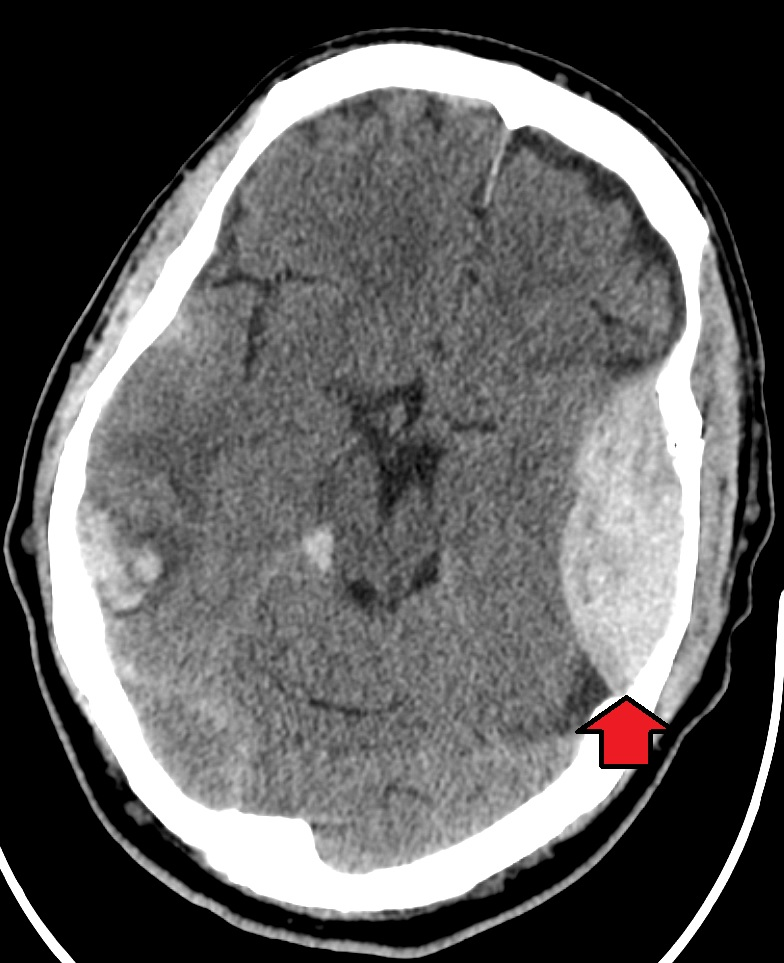
- Epidural hematoma as seen on a CT scan with overlying skull fracture. Note the biconvex shaped collection of blood. There is also bruising with bleeding on the opposite side of the brain.
- Specialty: Neurosurgery, neurology, emergency medicine
- Symptoms: Headache, confusion, loss of consciousness, nausea, vomiting, paralysis
- Usual onset: Rapid
- Causes: Head injury, bleeding disorder, blood vessel malformation
- Diagnostic method: Medical imaging (CT scan)
- Differential diagnosis: Subdural hematoma, subarachnoid hemorrhage, traumatic brain injury, transient ischemic attack seizure, intracranial abscess, brain tumor
- Treatment: Surgery (craniotomy, burr hole)

Epidural hematoma is when bleeding occurs between the tough outer membrane covering the brain (dura mater) and the skull, often as a result of traumatic brain injury. When this condition occurs in the spinal canal, it is known as a spinal epidural hematoma.

There may be loss of consciousness following a head injury, a brief regaining of consciousness (lucid period), and then loss of consciousness again, which is seen in about 14% to 21% of patients. Other symptoms may include headache, confusion, vomiting, an inability to move parts of the body, coma, or transient unconsciousness. In some patients, a small epidural hematoma may present with no symptoms. Complications may include seizures, increased intracranial pressure, cognitive impairment, and death if not treated promptly.

The cause is typically a head injury that results in a break of the temporal bone and bleeding from the middle meningeal artery. Around 10% of cases are attributed to venous bleeding as a result of injury to the dural venous sinus or diploic veins. Occasionally epidural hematoma can occur as a result of a bleeding disorder or blood vessel malformation. Diagnosis is typically by a CT scan or MRI scan, with noncontrast CT being preferred for prompt diagnosis.

Treatment is generally by urgent surgery in the form of a craniotomy or burr hole, or (in the case of a spinal epidural hematoma) laminotomy with spinal decompression.

The condition occurs in around 2% of head injuries. However, up to 15% of adults with severe head trauma may present with an epidural hematoma. It is most common in males ages 20 to 30 years old, and is strongly associated with trauma. Epidural hematoma is rare in patients greater than age 50 years and less than age 12 months.

== Signs and symptoms ==
Many people with epidural hematomas experience a lucid period immediately following the injury, with a delay before symptoms become evident. Because of this initial period of lucidity, it has been called "Talk and Die" syndrome. Other common symptoms include worsening headache, nausea and vomiting, and seizures.

An epidural hematoma may lead to an increase in intracranial pressure, especially if actively bleeding and enlarging. Signs of elevated intracranial pressure may include pupillary dilation on the same side as the hematoma, which indicates uncal herniation. An increase in intracranial pressure may also lead to compression of the brainstem, resulting in Cushing's triad: elevated blood pressure, slow heart rate, and irregular respiratory rate.

Other symptoms include weakness of the extremities on the opposite side from the lesion due to compression of the crossed pyramid pathways; and loss of the visual field on the opposite side of the lesion due to compression of the posterior cerebral artery. In rare cases, small hematomas may be asymptomatic.

In children, onset of symptoms may occur gradually over time. Additionally, skull fracture is less commonly seen in the pediatric population. These factors may make diagnosis more difficult in children.

== Causes ==
The interior of the skull has sharp ridges by which a moving brain can be injured or arteries can be sheared.

The most common cause of intracranial epidural hematoma is head injury, although spontaneous hemorrhages have been known to occur. Epidural hematomas occur in about 10% of traumatic brain injuries, mostly due to car accidents, assaults, or falls. They are often caused by acceleration-deceleration trauma and transverse forces.Nontraumatic causes may include bleeding disorders, vascular malformations, or bleeding tumors.

Rarely, epidural hematoma may develop as a complication of infections of the face or skull. This is likely attributed to vessel erosion on the dural surface or venous thrombosis.

== Pathophysiology ==
Most often, the break of the temporal bone causes bleeding from the middle meningeal artery. Epidural bleeding is often rapid as arteries are high-pressure flow. In 10% of cases, epidural hematoma results from an insult to the veins and can progress more slowly. A venous hematoma may be acute (occurring within a day of the injury and appearing as a swirling mass of blood without a clot on imaging), subacute (occurring in 2–4 days and appearing solid on imaging), or chronic (occurring in 7–20 days and appearing mixed or lucent on imaging). The typical convex (lentiform) shape seen on imaging is due to blood accumulation, which strips the dura mater from the inner surface of the skull.

In adults, the temporal region accounts for 75% of cases. In children, however, they occur with similar frequency in the occipital, frontal, and posterior fossa regions. Epidural bleeds from arteries can grow until they reach their peak size 6–8 hours post-injury, spilling 25–75 cubic centimeters of blood into the intracranial space. As the hematoma expands, it strips the dura from the inside of the skull, causing an intense headache. It also increases intracranial pressure, causing the brain to shift, lose blood supply, be crushed against the skull, or herniate. Epidural bleeds can quickly compress the brainstem, causing unconsciousness, abnormal posturing, and abnormal pupillary responses to light.

The classic lucid interval can be explained by adaptations in cerebral perfusion pressure. Initially, rupture of the middle meningeal artery or other vessels often leads to rapid decline and unconsciousness due to blood products exerting a mass effect on the brain. The body is able to alter cerebral perfusion pressure in response to this, leading to temporary recovery of consciousness known as the lucid interval.

With age, the dura mater adheres more strongly to the skull, reducing the potential space that allows formation of a hematoma. The same principle applies to young children, who are also less likely to develop an epidural hematoma following head trauma.

Epidural hematomas may calcify and are often referred to as ossified epidural hematomas. The pathophysiology behind this is thought to be due to an inflammatory response, but there is no scientific consensus at this point. It does appear that ossified epidural hematomas may be more prevalent in those who did not undergo surgical treatment.

== Diagnosis ==
Diagnosis is typically by CT scan or MRI. MRIs have greater sensitivity and should be used if there is a high suspicion of epidural hematoma and a negative CT scan. Plain radiography with x-rays are not typically helpful in diagnosis. Differential diagnoses include a transient ischemic attack, stroke, intracranial mass, brain abscess, acute subdural hematoma, or intracerebral hemorrhage.

Epidural hematomas usually appear convex in shape because their expansion stops at the skull's sutures, where the dura mater is tightly attached to the skull. Thus, they expand inward toward the brain rather than along the inside of the skull, as occurs in subdural hematomas. Most people also have a skull fracture from associated trauma that is frequently seen on imaging.

Epidural hematomas may occur in combination with subdural hematomas, or either may occur alone. In the hallmark of epidural hematoma, people may regain consciousness and appear completely normal during what is called a lucid interval, only to descend suddenly and rapidly into unconsciousness later. This lucid interval, which depends on the extent of the injury, is a key to diagnosing an epidural hematoma. However, a change in consciousness followed by a lucid interval may be seen in other conditions, such as an expanding brain mass.

Ossified epidural hematomas have a very characteristic appearance on CT scan. In the images, there is a bright rim of hyperattenuation corresponding to a high Hounsfield unit value, indicating high density structures containing calcium.

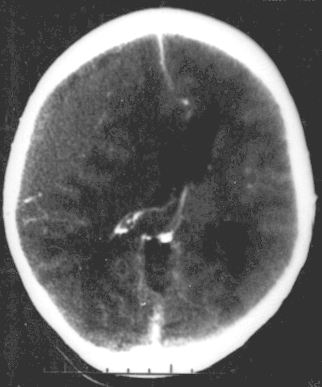
Nontraumatic epidural hematoma in a young woman. The grey area in the top left (patient's right) is an organizing hematoma, causing midline shift and compression of the ventricle.

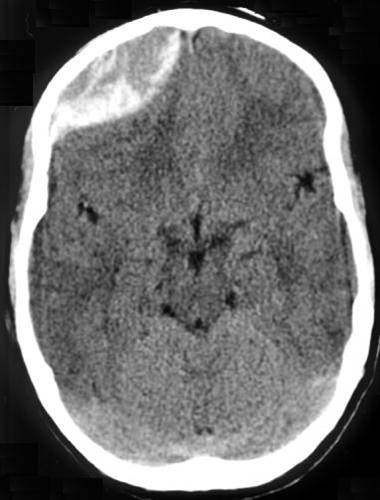
Non-contrast CT scan of a traumatic acute hematoma in the patient's right fronto-temporal area.

A diagram showing a normal brain (left), compared to a brain with an epidural hematoma (right).

== Treatment ==
Epidural hematoma is often a surgical emergency. In severe cases, delayed surgery can result in permanent brain damage or death. As with other types of intracranial hematomas, the blood often must be removed surgically to reduce the pressure on the brain. The hematoma is evacuated through a burr hole or craniotomy. Craniotomy is typically the preferred surgical treatment for outcomes and cost-effectiveness, but relies on the hospital having a neurosurgeon readily available. If transfer to a facility with neurosurgery is unavailable, trephination may be performed in the emergency department. Large hematomas and blood clots often require an open craniotomy.

It is extremely rare not to require surgery. If the volume of the epidural hematoma is less than 30 mL, the clot diameter is less than 15 mm, the patient has a Glasgow Coma Score above 8, and has no visible neurological symptoms, then it may be possible to treat conservatively without surgery. A CT scan should be performed, and watchful waiting should be done as the hematoma may suddenly expand.

In the case of active bleeding, blood transfusion may be indicated. Patients on anticoagulation or blood thinners are often given reversal agents or platelet transfusions.

Medications may be given after surgery. They may include antiseizure medications and hyperosmotic agents to reduce brain swelling and intracranial pressure.

Seizures as a result of trauma or epidural hematoma may be treated with antiepileptic medications. Research shows that antiseizure medications for the first week following a traumatic brain injury may decrease the chances of developing posttraumatic seizures. Commonly used agents include phenytoin and levetiracetam.

In the pediatric population, surgery is necessary in patients with symptomatic epidural hematoma. Otherwise, conservative treatment with observation may be warranted. In patients that develop an ossified epidural hematoma, surgical treatment is often recommended in the presence of symptoms, and close observation may be used for those who are asymptomatic. However, there is no standard consensus or guidelines on treatment of ossified epidural hematoma and management decisions are made on a case-by-case basis.

Postoperatively, serial imaging is performed to evaluate for recurrent hemorrhage. Frequent neurological examinations are also standard to detect signs of deterioration. Careful blood pressure control is important following treatment to reduce the risk of recurrence. Physical therapy, occupational therapy, and speech therapy rehabilitation are commonly used to support patients in recovery.

== Prognosis ==
Patients with epidural hematoma typically have an excellent prognosis with function recovery if the hematoma is found promptly and surgically treated. Delays in diagnosis or treatment are associated with an increase in both mortality and morbidity.

Advanced age, immediate coma without a lucid interval, pupillary changes, and a low Glasgow Coma Scale score are all associated with worse outcomes. Imaging features of large hematoma volume, midline shift, and active bleeding are also associated with worse prognosis.

Additionally, frailty significantly impacts the prognosis of those with epidural hematoma. A frailty index of 0.2 is associated with a double in mortality risk in those with traumatic brain injury.

Overall mortality is estimated to be up to 12.5% in adults, and 5% in children.

== Epidemiology ==
About 2% of head injuries and up to 15% of fatal head injuries involve an epidural hematoma. The condition is much more common in young adults, with a mean age between 20 and 30 years old. Epidural hematoma is much more uncommon in those older than 50. Epidural hematoma is only seen in about 2% to 3% of pediatric head injuries. Males are affected more than females. Approximately 3.1 million people worldwide experience traumatic epidural hematoma and meet surgical requirements for treatment yearly.

Similar to adults, pediatric epidural hematomas occur in around 2% to 3% of all cases of head trauma, with an average age between 6 to 10 years old. Ossified epidural hematomas are more common in the pediatric population, and more common among males within this population.
