= Clipping (medicine) =

Medical procedure

Surgical clip
- Other names: Hemostatic clip, Ligating clip, Vessel clip
- Classification: Implant, Ligation device

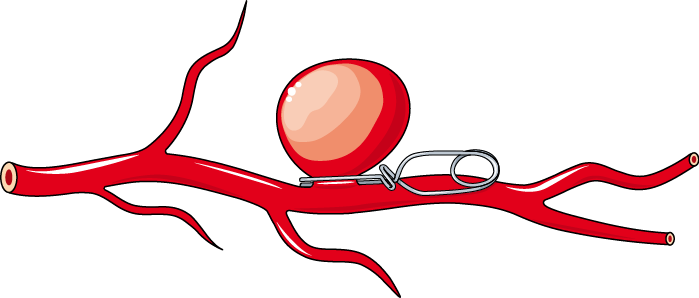
Aneurysm clip

Clipping is a surgical procedure performed to achieve hemostasis (stopping blood flow), ligate tissue bundles, or approximate tissue edges. Unlike sutures, which require the surgeon to tie a knot, surgical clips are mechanically compressed onto tissue using a specialized instrument known as a clip applier.

Most surgical clips are designed as permanent implants that remain in the patient's body indefinitely after the procedure. They are composed of biocompatible materials such as titanium, stainless steel, or synthetic polymers. Clips are a standard tool in minimally invasive surgery — particularly laparoscopy, where manual suturing is technically difficult due to limited space and maneuverability.

== History ==
The development of the surgical clip was driven by the need to control bleeding in inaccessible areas, particularly in the field of neurosurgery. Developments include:

- Cushing's Silver Clip (1911): The first dedicated hemostatic clip was introduced by Dr. Harvey Cushing in 1911. Cushing developed small V-shaped silver clips to occlude vessels in the brain that were too delicate or inaccessible for traditional suture ligation. These clips were compressed manually using a forceps-like instrument.
- Dandy's Aneurysm Clip (1937): Dr. Walter Dandy expanded the use of clips by performing the first intracranial aneurysm clipping in 1937. He utilized a malleable silver clip to occlude the neck of a posterior communicating artery aneurysm, a technique that replaced the higher-risk method of proximal artery ligation. The surgical technique has been modified and improved over the years. Surgical clipping has a lower rate of aneurysm recurrence after treatment. Titanium Aneurysm Clips are being used to clip aneurysms and the procedure is known as aneurysm clipping.
- Modern Era: In the latter half of the 20th century, materials shifted from silver (which was soft and reactive) to stainless steel and eventually titanium. The widespread adoption of laparoscopic surgery in the late 1980s significantly increased the demand for pre-loaded, automatic clip appliers and polymer locking clips (e.g., Hem-o-lok).

== Types and materials ==
Surgical clips are categorized by their material composition and intended permanence.

=== Permanent metal clips ===
- Titanium: The most common material for modern hemostatic clips. Titanium is biologically inert, non-corrosive, and non-ferromagnetic. This makes it generally safe for MRI scans, distinguishing it from older steel clips, though it may still produce "starburst" artifacts on CT images.
- Stainless steel: Historically common but less favored today for permanent implantation due to MRI incompatibility (ferromagnetism) and significant imaging artifacts.
- Aneurysm clips: These are specialized, high-tension clips used in neurosurgery. Unlike standard hemostatic clips which are crushed flat, aneurysm clips function as spring-loaded clamps to maintain constant closure force. They are often made from cobalt-chromium alloys (e.g., Phynox or Elgiloy) to prevent movement in magnetic fields.

=== Permanent polymer clips ===
Non-absorbable polymer clips are made from medical-grade plastics. They typically utilize a "lock-and-key" mechanism where the clip snaps shut around the tissue. They are radiolucent (do not obstruct X-rays or CT scans) and are capable of ligating larger tissue structures than standard metal clips.

=== Absorbable clips ===
A minority of clips are made from biodegradable materials such as polydioxanone. These provide temporary hemostasis and are absorbed by the body over a period of weeks or months.

== Medical uses ==
=== General and visceral surgery ===
Clips are extensively used in abdominal procedures. In a laparoscopic cholecystectomy, clips are the standard method for sealing the cystic duct and cystic artery before the gallbladder is removed. They are also used to control mesenteric vessels during bowel resections.

=== Urology (varicocele microsurgery) ===
Surgical clips play a significant role in microsurgical subinguinal varicocelectomy, a common procedure for repairing varicoceles (dilated veins in the scrotum).

- Procedure: Using a high-powered operating microscope, surgeons identify the testicular artery and lymphatic channels to preserve them. Small titanium clips (often sized "micro") are used to ligate the dilated internal spermatic veins.
- Advantages: The use of clips in this context significantly reduces operative time compared to traditional suture ligation. Because the clips are permanent, they provide durable occlusion of the refluxing veins. The precision of micro-clips also aids in avoiding accidental ligation of the lymphatics, which can lead to hydrocele.

=== Neurosurgery ===
Aneurysm clipping remains a primary treatment for cerebral aneurysms. A craniotomy is performed to access the brain, and a permanent spring-loaded clip is placed across the neck of the aneurysm to exclude it from blood circulation, preventing rupture.

=== Gastrointestinal endoscopy ===
Endoclips (or endoscopic clips) are a distinct category applied through a flexible endoscope. They are used to treat upper or lower GI bleeding (e.g., ulcers, post-polypectomy bleeding) or to close perforations in the gastrointestinal tract.

== Safety and complications ==
While generally safe, the use of surgical clips carries specific risks:

- Migration: Rarely, clips can migrate from their original position. In post-cholecystectomy patients, a clip may migrate into the common bile duct, potentially serving as a nidus for stone formation (clip-choledocholithiasis).
- Dislodgement: If a clip is placed on a vessel that is too large, or if the tissue undergoes necrosis, the clip may slip off, leading to postoperative hemorrhage.
- Imaging Interference: Metal clips create artifacts on CT scans (streaking) and MRI (signal void). While titanium is MRI-safe, older steel clips can be dangerous in an MRI environment due to magnetic movement or heating.

== See also ==
- Ligature (medicine)
- Hemostat
- Microsurgery
- Medical device
- Vascular surgery
