= Frank Henderson Mayfield =

American physician

Frank H. Mayfield
- Born: June 23, 1908; Garnett, South Carolina
- Died: January 2, 1991 (aged 82); Cincinnati, Ohio
- Occupation: Neurosurgeon
- Known for: Mayfield skull clamp
- Awards: 1st recipient of Cushing Medal

Frank Henderson Mayfield (June 23, 1908 – January 2, 1991), was an American neurosurgeon and founder of the Mayfield Clinic and Spine Institute in Cincinnati, Ohio. A pioneer in brain and spine surgery, he invented the spring aneurysm clip and the Mayfield skull clamp. Mayfield is best known for his clinical interests in peripheral nerve and spine injuries, development of neurosurgical instruments, and medical politics.

== Biography ==
Frank H. Mayfield was born in Garnett, South Carolina on June 23, 1908. Yet, most of his childhood years were enjoyed on a farm near Norlina, North Carolina, the family's home place for seven generations. He obtained his undergraduate degree from the University of North Carolina and planned for a career in public health until neurosurgery caught his interest. At the Medical College of Virginia, he was a student of Claude Coleman, a pioneer in neurosurgery. Upon completion of residency in 1935, he served as a graduate fellow and instructor at the University of Louisville under Roy Glenwood Spurling.

In 1937 Joseph Evans, MD, and Frank H. Mayfield, MD, were final candidates for a new position to head the neurosurgery division within the University of Cincinnati Department of Surgery. Mont Reid selected Evans for the academic post. Mayfield was about to return home when Sister Theodora offered him a position to start neurosurgery services at Good Samaritan Hospital. He accepted and on July 1, 1937, he moved to Cincinnati from Louisville and began his community-based practice.

Within a year Mayfield had so many patients that he was often working 90 hours a week, with 7 to 8 cases a day and frequent late-night trips to rural hospitals. He had a driver and slept en route. He had to carry a large bag of neurosurgical instruments everywhere he operated. This sparked his ingenuity to invent instruments for the new field of neurosurgery.

Soon after arriving in Cincinnati, Mayfield was called to war. From 1942 to 1945 he served as Chief of Neurosurgery at Percy Jones General Hospital under General Norman Kirk. More than 25,000 cases of major nerve injuries were treated during this time. Senator Bob Dole was a patient. Mayfield wrote numerous papers and a book about the treatment of causalgia (intense pain resulting from wounds to peripheral nerves) with surgical sympathectomy.

In 1948, Joseph Evans established the first neurosurgery residency program at the University of Cincinnati College of Medicine. In collaboration with Frank Mayfield, the program was expanded with the addition of neurosurgery departments at The Christ Hospital and Good Samaritan Hospital. The joint neurosurgical residency training program enabled residents to rotate and benefit from the strengths of both the University (Cincinnati General Hospital) under Evans's leadership and the community hospitals (Good Samaritan and Christ) under Mayfield's leadership.

After the war, Mayfield assumed leadership roles in numerous medical associations. His clinical practice and partnership rapidly expanded. In the 1960s, Ohio law allowed limited partnerships but not professional corporations. Taxation and malpractice insurance led the group to challenge the IRS and file for incorporation. In 1971 Mayfield, Lotspeich, Hunter and Budde, Ltd. became the first physician group in Ohio to incorporate.

In the national arena of organized medicine, Mayfield and his colleagues wisely perceived that the neurosurgical profession in America did not possess a unified voice. As president of the Harvey Cushing Society, he addressed this issue by gathering his political forces and diplomatically making plans. During his Presidential Address in 1965, he proclaimed that henceforth the Harvey Cushing Society would be the official voice of neurosurgery in the United States. He went on to suggest that a sub name be added, the American Association of Neurological Surgeons. The speech, which became known as the "Mayfield Proclamation," transformed the Cushing Society into the AANS.

Perhaps Frank Mayfield's greatest local political impact was his three-decade crusade to defuse the town versus gown conflicts between the university and its private hospital competitors. In 1951, Mayor Cash asked Mayfield to join the UC Board of Directors with one charge – to make the community hospitals surrounding the University of Cincinnati College of Medicine and Cincinnati General Hospital a part of the University Center. In 1967, Mayfield drafted a Master Plan for Walter Langsam, President of the university. At the time, UC was not ready for such a plan. Not until 1982 did changes in leadership allow elements of Mayfield's Master Plan to come to fruition.

In 1973, upon his 65th birthday and by pre-arrangement, Mayfield yielded control of the practice. The group renamed the practice Mayfield Neurological Institute, Inc. in his honor. Today, it is known as Mayfield Brain and Spine.

Dr. Mayfield died on January 2, 1991, at Good Samaritan Hospital.

== Inventions ==
=== Mayfield clip and clip applier ===
In 1952, Frank Mayfield and George Kees, a medical illustrator, develop the Mayfield clip and clip applier, to shut off the blood supply to a brain aneurysm. Mayfield had the idea to develop a small, cross-legged clip and an applicator with tweezers-like dexterity to permit for trial-and-error placement of the clip across the neck of an aneurysm. The metal clip would have to be malleable enough so that it could be twisted into shape and still retain its spring recoil. If, after placement, the clip had to be removed, it could be accomplished by using the forceps as if it were tweezers.

The applier grasps the clip and holds the legs open by way of a drop lock on its proximal end. The drop lock is automatically released when the applier is compressed. Shortly after its invention, a California surgeon called in desperate hopes of securing the clips in time to use them during an upcoming operation on actress Patricia Neal. Mayfield told the surgeon to contact the props man on the set of the TV show, Ben Casey, where their use had been featured in a recent episode.

Modifications and improvements to the Mayfield clip followed. Charles Drake worked with Mayfield to develop a fenestrated clip through which the posterior cerebral artery could pass, thus facilitating occlusion of basilar terminus aneurysms. That clip would be called the Drake fenestrated clip.

=== Mayfield headrest and skull clamp ===
In 1967, Frank Mayfield and George Kees develop the Mayfield Horseshoe and General Purpose Headrests, based on Mayfield's observations from a dental chair. The padded headrests were designed to cradle and stabilize the head off the end of the operating table and allow the surgeon better access during surgery. Subsequently, in 1973, the Mayfield three-pin skull clamp was designed to rigidly affix a patient's head to the operating table during craniotomy drilling and delicate microneurosurgery. The Mayfield Headrest and Skull Clamp System are the most common and widely used neurosurgical instruments today.

The increased manufacture and sale of neurosurgical instruments lead to formation of the Ohio Medical Instrument Company. The company, initially owned by George Kees, Frank H. Mayfield, MD, Edgar Lotspeich, MD, Curwood Hunter, MD, and Richard Budde, MD, spawned development of many instruments now considered standard in neurosurgery. Today, the Mayfield and Budde instruments, including the Mayfield MR/X-Ray Skull Clamp and the Disposable and Reusable Titanium Skull Pins, are manufactured and sold by Integra LifeSciences Corporation.

== Honors ==
An exceptional world view of neurosurgery led Mayfield to participate actively in the development of the specialty. He was elected to the presidencies of the Ohio State Neurosurgical Society in 1947, the Academy of Medicine of Cincinnati in 1950, and the Ohio State Medical Association in 1959. In 1958, he was appointed to the American Board of Neurological Surgery and became its chairman in 1962. He received their Distinguished Service Award in 1969. He was elected president of the Harvey Cushing Society (now the American Association of Neurological Surgeons (AANS)) in 1964–1965. He was honored as the Ohio Neurosurgeon of the Year in 1976, and chosen as the Honored Guest of the Congress of Neurological Surgeons (CNS) in 1979. In 1977, he was the first recipient of the prestigious Harvey Cushing Medal awarded by the AANS. He earned Distinguished Service Awards by the American Medical Association in 1980 and the Society of Neurological Surgeons in 1981. Surgical Neurology named him Neurosurgeon of the Year in 1982. He was recognized internationally with an honorary membership in the Society of British Neurological Surgeons and as honorary president of the World Federation of Neurological Societies. For his leadership, community service, accomplishments, and awareness of the needs of others, Mayfield was named a Great Living Cincinnatian in 1980.

In his honor, Good Samaritan Hospital dedicated the Mayfield Center for Neurological Surgery in 1982. The Mayfield Award was established in 1983 by the CNS to be presented annually to a resident for a paper on spine research. To foster and continue Mayfield's dedication to teaching and research, the Frank H. Mayfield Endowed Chair in Neurosurgery has been created at the University of Cincinnati College of Medicine.
