= ITM2B =

Protein-coding gene in the species Homo sapiens

Identifiers
- Aliases: ITM2B, ABRI, BRI, BRI2, BRICD2B, E25B, E3-16, FBD, imBRI2, RDGCA, integral membrane protein 2B
- External IDs: OMIM: 603904; MGI: 1309517; GeneCards: ITM2B

Gene location (Human)
Chr.	Chromosome 13 (human)
Band	13q14.2	Start	48,232,612 bp
Band	13q14.2	End	48,270,357 bp

Gene location (Mouse)
Chr.	Chromosome 14 (mouse)
Band	14 D3|14 38.88 cM	Start	73,599,666 bp
Band	14 D3|14 38.88 cM	End	73,622,729 bp
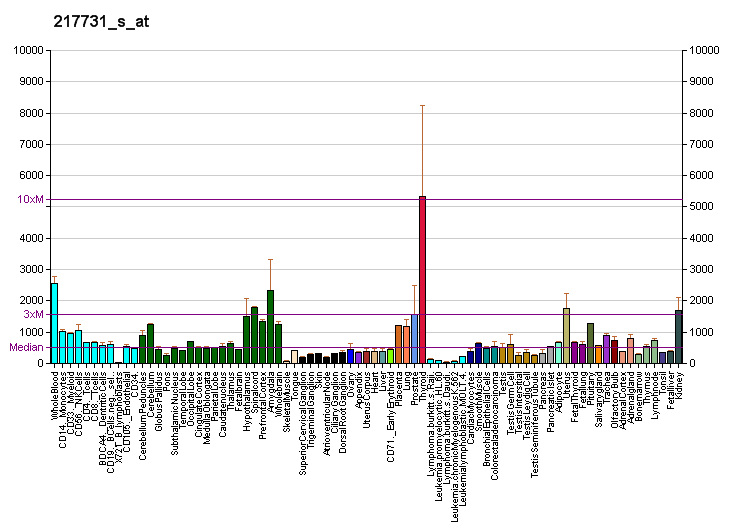

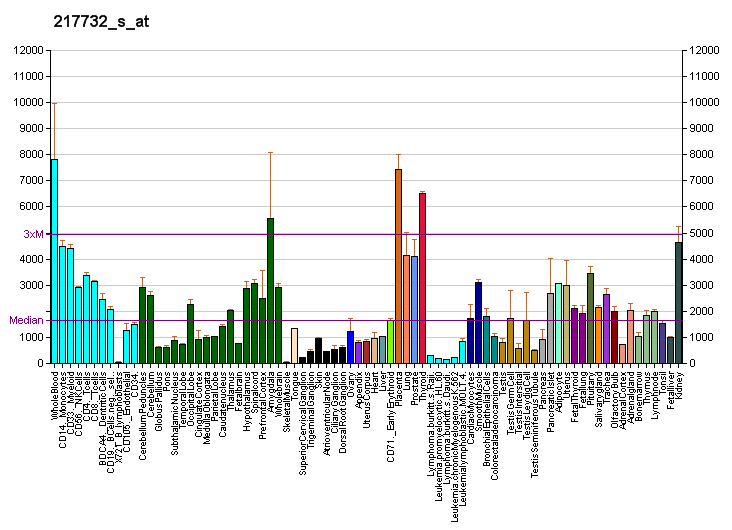
RNA expression pattern
Bgee	Human / Mouse (ortholog); Top expressed in: glomerulus; metanephric glomerulus; corpus epididymis; germinal epithelium; kidney tubule; visceral pleura; jejunal mucosa; renal medulla; parietal pleura; caput epididymis / Top expressed in: stroma of bone marrow; vestibular sensory epithelium; skin of external ear; molar; lobe of prostate; transitional epithelium of urinary bladder; right lung; calvaria; right lung lobe; efferent ductule; More reference expression data
BioGPS	More reference expression data
Gene ontology
Molecular function	amyloid-beta binding; protein binding; ATP binding
Cellular component	integral component of organelle membrane; extracellular region; integral component of membrane; Golgi-associated vesicle membrane; Golgi membrane; endosome; plasma membrane; Golgi apparatus; endosome membrane; extracellular exosome; membrane; intracellular membrane-bounded organelle; extracellular space
Biological process	nervous system development; negative regulation of amyloid precursor protein biosynthetic process
Sources:Amigo / QuickGO
Orthologs
Databases	NCBI: entry; OMA: entry
Species	Human	Mouse
Entrez	9445	16432
Ensembl	ENSG00000136156	ENSMUSG00000022108
UniProt	Q9Y287	O89051
RefSeq (mRNA)	NM_021999	NM_008410
RefSeq (protein)	NP_068839	NP_032436
Location (UCSC)	Chr 13: 48.23 – 48.27 Mb	Chr 14: 73.6 – 73.62 Mb
PubMed search
- Wikidata
View/Edit Human	View/Edit Mouse

Integral membrane protein 2B (ITM2B or BRI2) is a protein that in humans is encoded by the ITM2B gene.

ITM2B or BRI2 is a gene located on chromosome 13. The gene is connected to familial Danish dementia and familial British dementia causing amyloid and pre-filbrillar effects similar to those seen in Alzheimer's.
