= Boston criteria =

Diagnostic criteria for cerebral amyloid angiopathy

The Boston criteria version 2.0 is a set of guidelines designed to diagnose cerebral amyloid angiopathy (CAA), a disease that affects small blood vessels in the brain, particularly those in the cortex and leptomeninges. Although the gold standard for diagnosis is histopathological examination, the Boston criteria provide clinicians with a probabilistic approach for diagnosis largely based on imaging characteristics.

CAA is characterized by the progressive accumulation of a protein called amyloid β in the walls of these blood vessels. CAA is a major cause of lobar intracerebral haemorrhage, which is bleeding in the brain that occurs in the lobes of the brain. CAA is also a contributing factor to age-related cognitive impairment, which is a decline in cognitive function that occurs with aging.

It is important to accurately diagnose CAA during a patient's lifetime because it can affect clinical care and research participation.

Accurate diagnosis can also help researchers enroll appropriate participants in studies aimed at understanding the disease and developing new treatments.

The Boston criteria are intended to provide high diagnostic accuracy with reasonable simplicity, making them useful for both clinical practice and research. The criteria are designed to be applicable across the clinical spectrum of CAA-related presentations, meaning they can be used to diagnose the disease in patients with a variety of symptoms and conditions. The criteria are also intended to be used across clinical settings, meaning they can be applied in different healthcare environments and by different healthcare professionals.

In a study published in 2023, the authors found that the Boston criteria v2.0 substantially increases the proportion of patients with lobar ICH classified as probable CAA in comparison to the Boston criteria v1.5.

== Development of the Boston Criteria ==
Initially, CAA was only defined histopathology as deposition of β-amyloid in the cerebrovasculature. Through the 1980s the disorder was diagnosed in patients with available brain tissue from hematoma evacuation, biopsy, or most commonly post-mortem exam.

The introduction of the imaging-based Boston Criteria in the 1990s marked a significant milestone in the diagnosis of cerebral amyloid angiopathy (CAA). This development enabled the establishment of a diagnosis of probable CAA in living patients without access to brain tissue, effectively shifting the focus from the pathologist's purview to that of the clinician.

The criteria for diagnosing cerebral amyloid angiopathy (CAA) were initially introduced in 1995 through the Methods segment of an analysis of CAA and the apolipoprotein E ε4 allele. This was further elaborated in 1996, where the criteria were presented as a table in a clinical-pathologic case report. These criteria were based on the category terminology that is typically applied to other brain disorders such as Alzheimer's disease. The authors of the criteria defined definite CAA, probable CAA and possible CAA. Definite CAA is diagnosed only through full autopsy, while probable or possible CAA is identified through brain imaging and clinical exclusions. Additionally, there is a category of probable CAA with supporting pathology that is based on clinical scenarios where only limited brain tissue is available for biopsy or hematoma evacuation, as presented in Table 1. In order to avoid diagnosing CAA when the pathology is only mild and incidental, definite CAA requires high neuropathological severity, including features of advanced vasculopathy like amyloid replacement and splitting of the blood vessel wall. For probable CAA with supporting pathology, lesser histopathological severity is required to reflect the smaller amount of sampled tissue and the consequent lower likelihood of identifying the most advanced foci of the disease.

	Boston criteria version 2.0 for sporadic cerebral amyloid angiopathy
Definite CAA	Full brain post-mortem examination demonstrating: Spontaneous intracerebral haemorrhage, transient focal neurological episodes, convexity subarachnoid haemorrhage, or cognitive impairment or dementia; Severe CAA with vasculopathy; Absence of other diagnostic lesion
Probable CAA with supporting pathology	Clinical data and pathological tissue (evacuated haematoma or cortical biopsy) demonstrating: Presentation with spontaneous intracerebral haemorrhage; transient focal neurological episodes, convexity subarachnoid haemorrhage, or cognitive impairment or dementia; Some degree of CAA in specimen; Absence of other diagnostic lesion
Probable CAA	For patients aged 50 years and older, clinical data and MRI demonstrating: Presentation with spontaneous intracerebral haemorrhage, transient focal neurological episodes, or cognitive impairment or dementia; At least two of the following strictly lobar haemorrhagic lesions on T2*-weighted MRI, in any combination: intracerebral haemorrhage, cerebral microbleeds, or foci of cortical superficial siderosis or convexity subarachnoid haemorrhage; OR One lobar haemorrhagic lesion plus one white matter feature (severe perivascular spaces in the centrum semiovale or white matter hyperintensities in a multispot pattern)†: Absence of any deep haemorrhagic lesions (ie, intracerebral haemorrhage or cerebral microbleeds) on T2*-weighted MRI; Absence of other cause of haemorrhagic lesions‡; Haemorrhagic lesion in cerebellum not counted as either lobar or deep haemorrhagic lesion
Possible CAA	For patients aged 50 years and older, clinical data and MRI demonstrating: Presentation with spontaneous intracerebral haemorrhage, transient focal neurological episodes, or cognitive impairment or dementia; Absence of other cause of haemorrhage‡; One strictly lobar haemorrhagic lesion on T2*-weighted MRI: intracerebral haemorrhage, cerebral microbleeds, or foci of cortical superficial siderosis or convexity subarachnoid haemorrhage; OR: One white matter feature (severe visible perivascular spaces in the centrum semiovale or white matter hyperintensities in a multispot pattern)†; Absence of any deep haemorrhagic lesions (ie, intracerebral haemorrhage or cerebral microbleeds) on T2*-weighted MRI • Absence of other cause of haemorrhagic lesions‡; Haemorrhagic lesion in cerebellum not counted as either lobar or deep haemorrhagic lesion
	CAA=cerebral amyloid angiopathy. †Notable changes from the Boston criteria v1.5. ‡Other causes of haemorrhagic lesion: antecedent head trauma, haemorrhagic transformation of an ischaemic stroke, arteriovenous malformation, haemorrhagic tumour, CNS vasculitis. Other causes of cortical superficial siderosis and acute convexity subarachnoid haemorrhage should also be excluded.
