= Pseudoaneurysm =

Collection of blood between outer artery layers

- Other names: False aneurysm
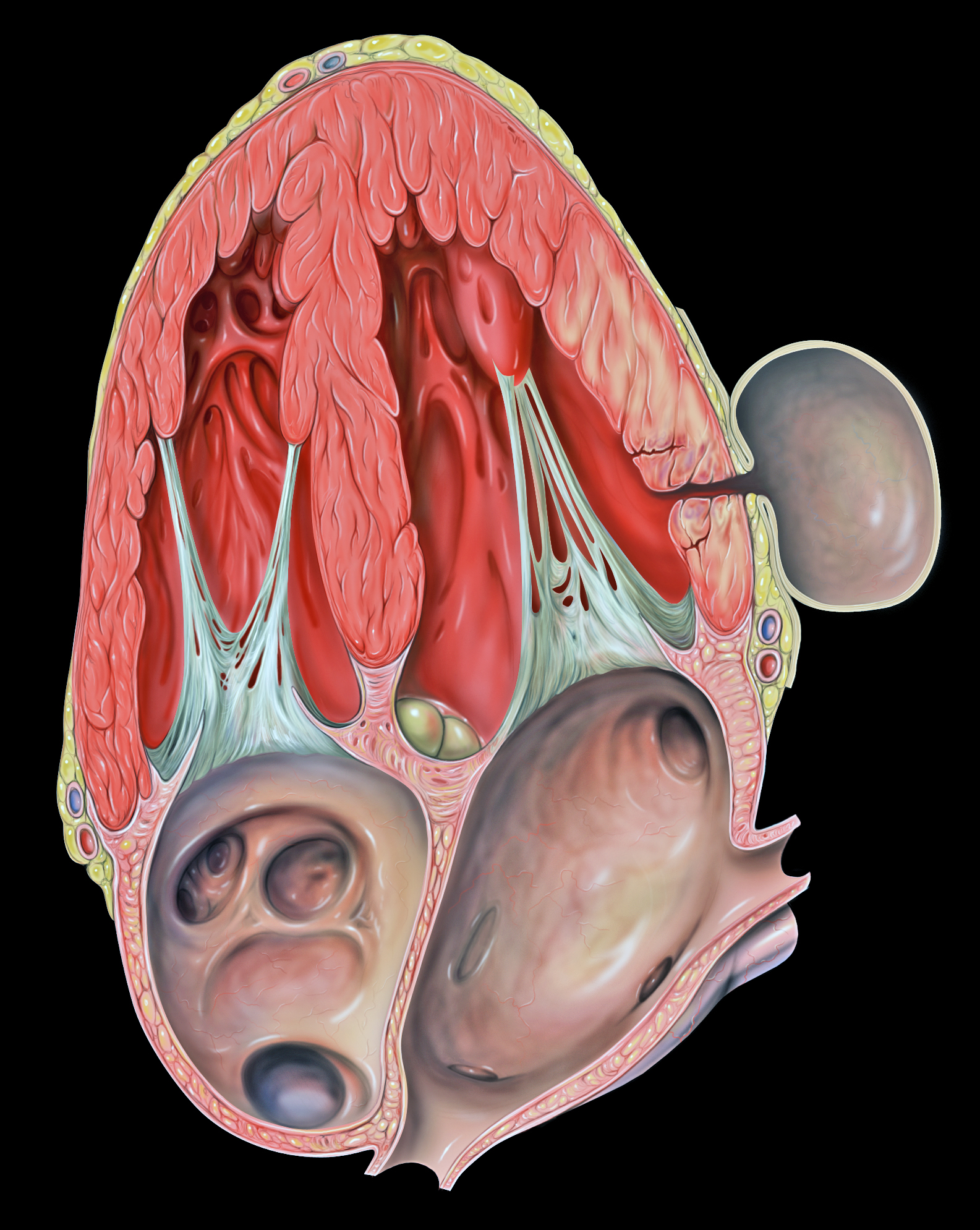
- Pseudoaneurysm of the left ventricle, four-chamber echocardiography view
- Specialty: Cardiology

A pseudoaneurysm, also known as a false aneurysm, is a locally contained hematoma outside an artery or the heart due to damage to the vessel wall. The injury passes through all three layers of the arterial wall, causing a leak, which is contained by a new, weak "wall" formed by the products of the clotting cascade. A pseudoaneurysm (PSA) does not contain any layer of the vessel wall.

This differentiates it from a true aneurysm, which is contained by all three layers of the vessel wall, and a dissecting aneurysm, which has a breach in the innermost layer of an artery and subsequent dissection/separation of the tunica intima from the tunica media.

A pseudoaneurysm, being associated with a vessel, can be pulsatile; it may be confused with a true aneurysm or dissecting aneurysm.

The most common presentation of pseudoaneurysm is femoral artery pseudoaneurysm following access for an endovascular procedure, and this event may complicate up to 8% of vascular interventional procedures. Small pseudoaneurysms are capable of spontaneous clotting, while others require surgical intervention.

A pseudoaneurysm may also occur in a chamber of the heart following myocardial damage due to ischemia or trauma. A pseudoaneurysm of the left ventricle is a potentially lethal complication of a heart attack.

== Signs and symptoms ==
Pseudoaneurysms usually present as a painful, tender, pulsatile mass. The overlying skin is sometimes erythematous (red). They can sometimes be confused with abscesses. The patient may describe a history of catheterization or trauma, and they may note that the pulsatile mass is gradually expanding.

== Diagnosis ==
The diagnosis should be suspected if the patient has a history of arterial trauma. This can include arterial access for catheterization (i.e., the common femoral artery), blunt trauma (i.e., to an extremity), or penetrating trauma (i.e., gunshot or blast injury). Blunt or penetrating trauma can cause a disruption in the arterial wall, leading to a pseudoaneurysm. A patient with such a history who presents with a painful, pulsatile, tender mass at the site of catheterization or trauma should be suspected to have a pseudoaneurysm. The diagnosis should be confirmed using Duplex ultrasonography, which will reveal arterial blood flow into the pseudoaneurysm. A CT angiogram or conventional angiogram can also diagnose a pseudoaneurysm.

It is important that the diagnosis be confirmed before any procedures are performed. Incision and drainage of a suspected abscess, which is instead a pseudoaneurysm, could lead to extensive hemorrhage.

== Locations ==
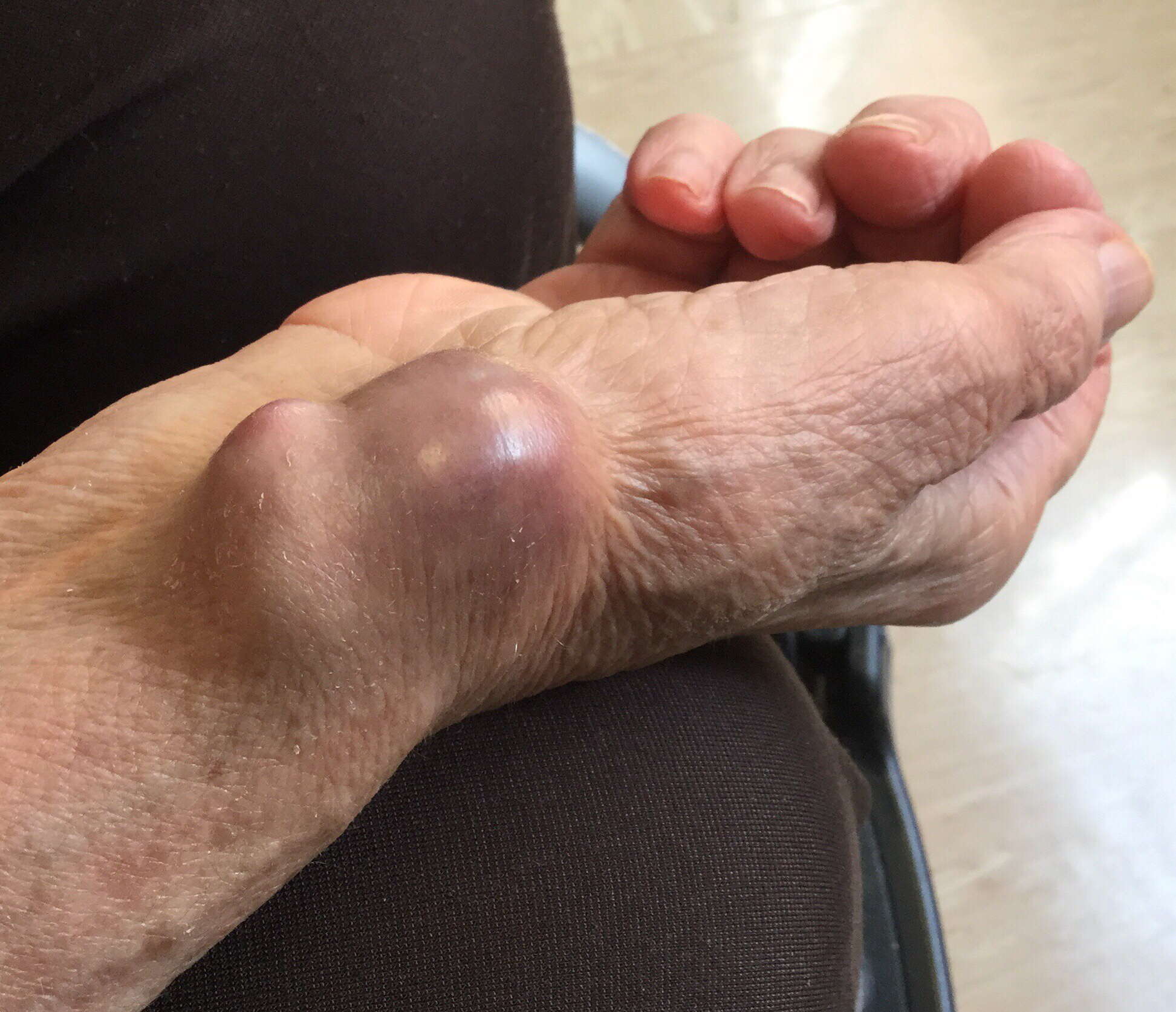
Radial artery pseudoaneurysm.

A pseudoaneurysm can form in communication with essentially any artery in the body. With the high volume of cardiac catheterizations performed today, femoral artery pseudoaneurysms, in addition to pseudoaneurysms of arteriovenous fistulas used for hemodialysis, are the most common. These fistulas [or grafts] may get infected and may rupture, leading to massive bleeding and death.

Pseudoaneurysms can form in the legs days, months, or even years after blunt or penetrating trauma.

Although aneurysms and left ventricular aneurysms may involve any wall segment, "aneurysms" in the posterolateral wall are frequently due to pseudoaneurysms. In contrast, the most common location for a true left ventricular aneurysm involves the apex of the heart.

A pseudoaneurysm can also occur in the aorta as a consequence of traumatic aortic rupture.

Outside of the heart, pseudoaneurysms associated with pancreatitis can occur in several of the abdominal vessels, including the superior mesenteric artery, superior pancreaticoduodenal artery, inferior pancreaticoduodenal artery, and others.

== Treatment ==
Many options exist for the treatment of pseudoaneurysms. While surgery was the gold-standard treatment in the past, several less-invasive treatment options are popular today.

=== Covered stent ===
Since the pseudoaneurysm communicates with an artery through a hole in the arterial wall, a covered stent may be placed endovascularly across this hole to "exclude it," or to prevent it from receiving blood flow from the artery. The covered stent is composed of metal and is covered with Teflon (PTFE) or another sterile fabric-like material. The covered stent remains in place permanently, and the pseudoaneurysm, without a continuous flow of arterial blood, then thromboses. Advantages of this technique are that it has a high success rate without the need for an open surgery. Complications include covered stent migration, persistent leakage of blood into the pseudoaneurysm, fracturing (breaking) of the stent, and infection of the stent or of the arterial insertion site.

=== Ultrasound probe compression ===
Another option for treatment is ultrasound probe compression of the neck of the pseudoaneurysm. The "neck" of the pseudoaneurysm is the narrow path of blood flow between the artery, through the arterial wall, and into the pseudoaneurysm cavity. The artery, neck, and pseudoaneurysm are seen on ultrasound. The ultrasound probe can be pushed firmly against the patient's skin to compress the neck of the pseudoaneurysm for usually about 20 minutes. During this time, the blood within the pseudoaneurysm clots; after the probe is then removed, the pseudoaneurysm will hopefully remain clotted and will not continue to expand. The procedure may be stopped early due to patient discomfort. It is less successful if the patient is obese, since there is more fatty tissue between the skin and the neck of the pseudoaneurysm. It also is less successful if the neck of the pseudoaneurysm is wider, since it is less likely to clot off during the period of compression. Finally, it is also much less successful if the patient is taking aspirin, warfarin (Coumadin), or another anticoagulant, since these would prevent clotting of blood within the pseudoaneurysm. Advantages are that this is the least invasive method of stopping arterial blood flow into a pseudoaneurysm.

=== Ultrasound-guided thrombin injection ===
In addition to covered stent placement, another popular, minimally-invasive technique used today is ultrasound-guided thrombin injection. Thrombin (factor IIa in the coagulation cascade) is a clotting factor that converts fibrinogen into fibrin, which then polymerizes to form a blood clot. Under ultrasound guidance, thrombin can be injected directly into a pseudoaneurysm, causing it to clot. Advantages are that the technique is relatively easy to perform, is successful, and is minimally invasive. One contraindication to this procedure is if there is an arteriovenous fistula (communication between an artery and vein), in addition to the pseudoaneurysm. This occurs with about 10% of pseudoaneurysms. If this is present, thrombin injected into the pseudoaneurysm could then enter the venous circulation and possibly lead to distant thrombosis.

=== Surgical ligation (with or without distal bypass) ===
Open surgery may also be performed to remove pseudoaneurysms or prevent them from expanding. If the artery is small and "expendable" - the tissues it supplies have adequate collateral blood flow - then the artery supplying the pseudoaneurysm may be ligated both proximally and distally to the pseudoaneurysm. The pseudoaneurysm may or may not be removed. If the tissues supplied by the artery do not have sufficient collateral flow (the artery is not expendable), then a vein or synthetic graft would have to be anastomosed proximally and distally to allow for continued blood flow around the pseudoaneurysm. Advantages are that the technique has been successful in the treatment of pseudoaneurysms for many years. However, it is more invasive (a large skin incision is necessary), and there is more postoperative pain and a risk for wound infection. One of the less invasive options may be preferred in a patient with many comorbidities, who is at high risk for surgery.

== See also ==
- Intradural pseudoaneurysm
