= Intradural pseudoaneurysm =

Intracranial vascular condition

Intradural pseudoaneurysm is a broad term to describe several subtypes of aneurysms that fundamentally are different from the more typical intracranial berry-type aneurysms.
