= Van Meekeren =

Van Meekeren is a Dutch surname. Notable people with the surname include:

- Job Janszoon van Meekeren (1611–1666), Dutch surgeon
- Paul van Meekeren (born 1993), Dutch cricketer

== See also ==
- Van Meegeren
