= Cranioplasty =

Surgical operation on skull

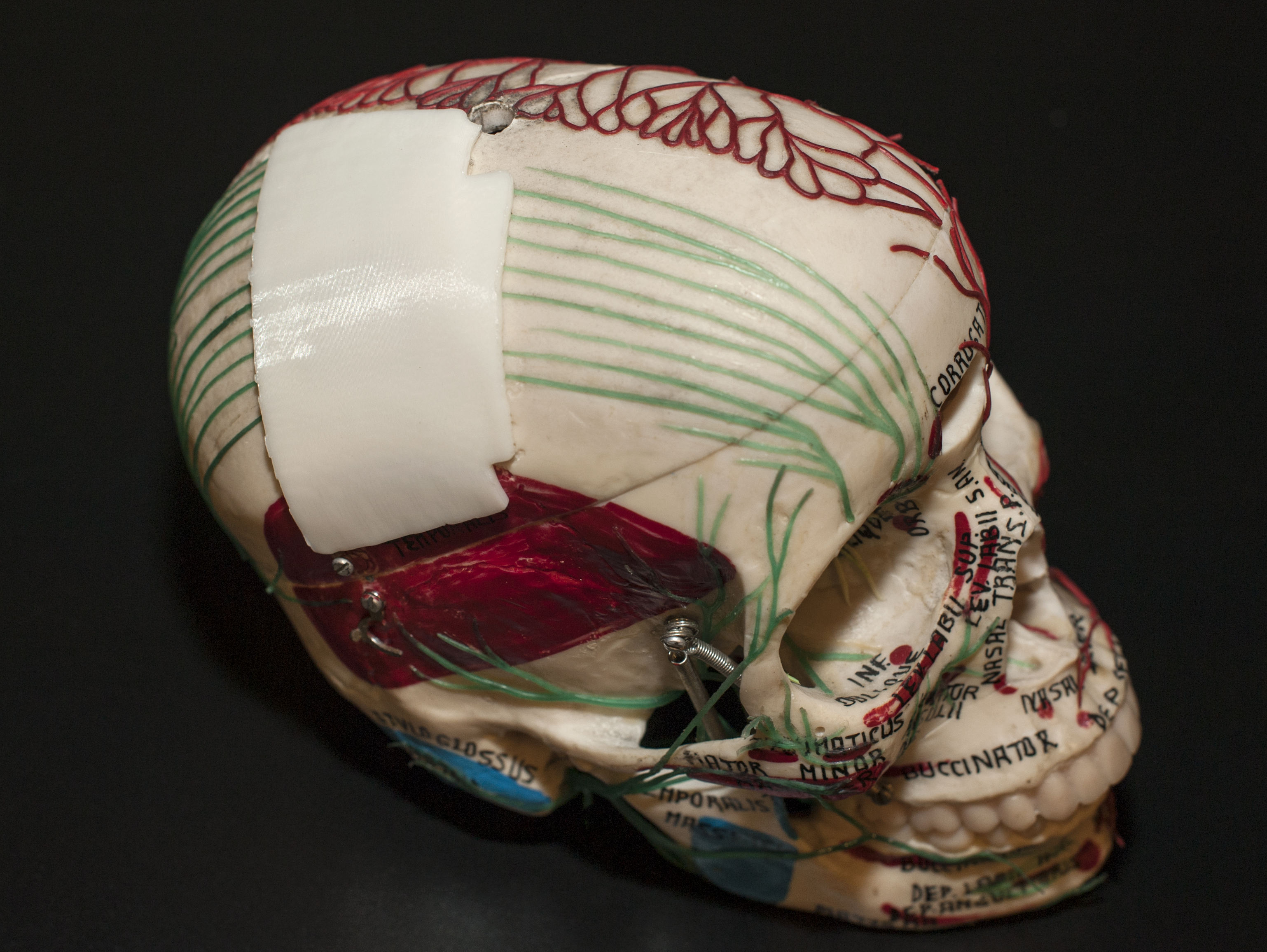
- 3D-printed prosthesis for cranioplasty
- ICD-9-CM: 02.0

Cranioplasty is a surgical operation on the repairing of cranial defects caused by previous injuries or operations, such as decompressive craniectomy. It is performed by filling the defective area with a range of materials, usually a bone piece from the patient or a synthetic material. Cranioplasty is carried out by incision and reflection of the scalp after applying anaesthetics and antibiotics to the patient. The temporalis muscle is reflected, and all surrounding soft tissues are removed, thus completely exposing the cranial defect. The cranioplasty flap is placed and secured on the cranial defect. The wound is then sealed.

Cranioplasty was closely related to trephination, and the earliest operation is dated to 3000 BC. Currently, the procedure is performed for both cosmetic and functional purposes. Cranioplasty can restore the normal shape of the skull and prevent other complications caused by a sunken scalp, such as the "syndrome of the trephined". Cranioplasty is a risky operation, with potential risks such as bacterial infection and bone flap resorption.

== Etymology ==
The word cranioplasty can be broken down into two parts: cranio- and -plasty. Cranio- originates from the Ancient Greek word κρανίον, meaning "cranium", while -plasty comes from the Ancient Greek word πλαστός, meaning "moulded" or "fashioned".

== Medical uses ==
The operation has its cosmetic value as the normal shape of the cranium of patients is restored instead of the presence of a sunken skin flap, which may affect the confidence of patients.

It also has its therapeutic value as the operation provides structure to the skull and protection to the brain from physical damage. The surgery restores regular cerebrospinal fluid (CSF) and cerebral blood flow dynamics, along with normal intracranial pressure. Cranioplasty may improve neurological function in some individuals. Furthermore, it can reduce the occurrence of headaches caused by injury or previous surgery.

The optimal timing of cranioplasty is controversial. Some experts put the time between a craniectomy and a cranioplasty at usually between 6 months and a year, while others say that the two operations should be more than a year apart.

The timing of cranioplasty is affected by multiple factors. Sufficient time is required for the recovery of the incision from the previous operation, as well as to clear any infections (both systemic and cranial). Some findings showed that a greater infection rate is associated with early cranioplasty due to interruption of wound healing, as well as an increased incidence of hydrocephalus. Contrarily, there is evidence of early cranioplasty limiting complications caused by "syndrome of the trephined", including changes in cerebral blood flow and abnormal cerebrospinal fluid hydrodynamics. Other researchers have reported no significant difference in infection rate with different operational timings.

Contraindications for cranioplasty include the presence of bacterial infection, brain swelling, and hydrocephalus. Cranioplasty is withheld until all contraindications are cleared.

== Procedure ==
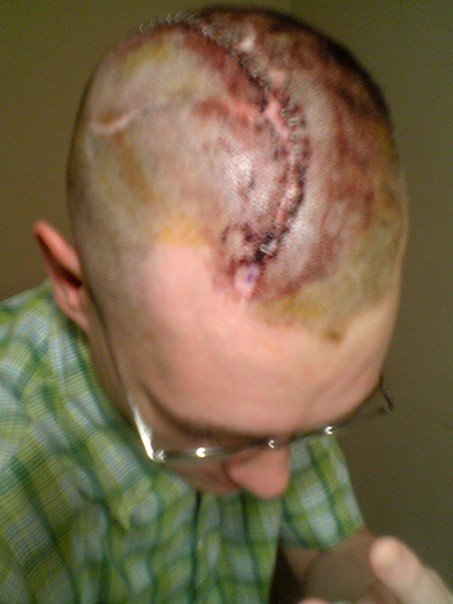
Scar remained from a cranioplasty

Before the operation, CT scans and MRIs are taken to study the cranial defect. The patient is given antibiotics to prevent bacterial infection.

The patient is situated on a foam donut or a horseshoe head holder for the operation. The patient is then anaesthetised and an incision is made following the incision of the previous operation. The scalp and the temporalis muscle is reflected to completely reveal the cranial defect. Significant blood loss is observed as new blood vessels formed in scar tissues are damaged by incision. Any soft tissues at the edge of the defect are removed and the defect is cleaned. The cranioplasty material is placed on the defect and is fixed to the surrounding skull with standard titanium plate and screws. CSF may be drained from the brain to reduce herniation. Small holes may be drilled on the bone graft or the prosthesis to prevent the accumulation of fluid under the repaired defect. Soft tissues, temporalis, and the scalp are then fixed back in place. Subgaleal drain and dressing are applied to control facial swelling.

After the operation, a CT scan is taken and patients may stay in intensive care for at least a night for better neurological status observation, or be placed in a regular care unit. The subgaleal drain and dressing are removed before the patient is dispatched.

=== Children ===
Special considerations to children undergoing cranioplasty are made to accommodate for their growing cranium. Certain materials are more favoured when compared to adult cranioplasty.

Autologous bone grafts are the most preferred materials for paediatric cranioplasty, as they are accepted by the host and the bone flap can be integrated into the body of the host. However, autologous bone pieces may be unavailable or unsuitable in certain occasions. The body size of children may be not enough to have bone flaps to be stored in their subcutaneous spaces, while cryopreservation facilities for bone grafts are not widely available. The use of autograft is also associated with a high rate of bone resorption.

Synthetic materials are used for paediatric cranioplasty when the use of autografts is not available or not recommended. Hydroxyapatite is another option for children cranioplasty as it allows the expansion of cranium for children and its ability to be moulded smoothly. It is less commonly used than autografts due to its brittle nature, high infection rate, and poor ability to integrate with the human cranium.

Bilateral cranioplasties are more prone to complications compared to unilateral cranioplasties in children. This may be explained by its larger scalp wound area, a higher volume of blood loss, and the higher complexity and duration of the operation.

== Risks ==
Cranioplasty's complication risk ranges from 15% to 41%. The cause for such a high risk compared to that borne by other neurosurgical operations is unclear. Male patients and older patients are groups with higher rates of complication.

Complications occurring after cranioplasty include bacterial infection, bone flap resorption, wound dehiscence, hematoma, seizures, hygroma, and cerebrospinal fluid (CSF) leakage.

The risk of bacterial infections in performing cranioplasty ranges from 5 to 12.8%. Multiple factors are affecting the risk of infection, one being the materials used for the operation. Using titanium, whether being custom-made or using a mesh, is associated with a lower infection rate; on the other hand, materials such as methyl methacrylate and autologous bone is associated with a higher infection rate. Another risk factor for bacterial infection is the location of the operation. Bifrontal cranioplasties are associated with significantly higher infection rates and higher rates for reoperation. Other risk factors for infection include previous infections, contact between sinuses and operation site, devascularized scalp (loss of blood supply in the scalp), previous operations, and type of injury.

Bone resorption is another complication of cranioplasty with a complication rate of 0.7-17.4%. Bone resorption occurs when the autologous graft does not have blood supply due to devitalisation, or when scar tissues or soft tissues remain on the edge of the cranial defect during cranioplasty. Paediatric patients have a higher risk of resorption, with a resorption rate up to 50%. Bone resorption is more likely to occur in this group of patients when their cranioplasty is carried out over 6 weeks after their previous operation. Fragmented bone flaps, as well as large bone flaps (>70 cm^{2}), are associated with a higher resorption rate.

== History ==
=== Ancient history ===
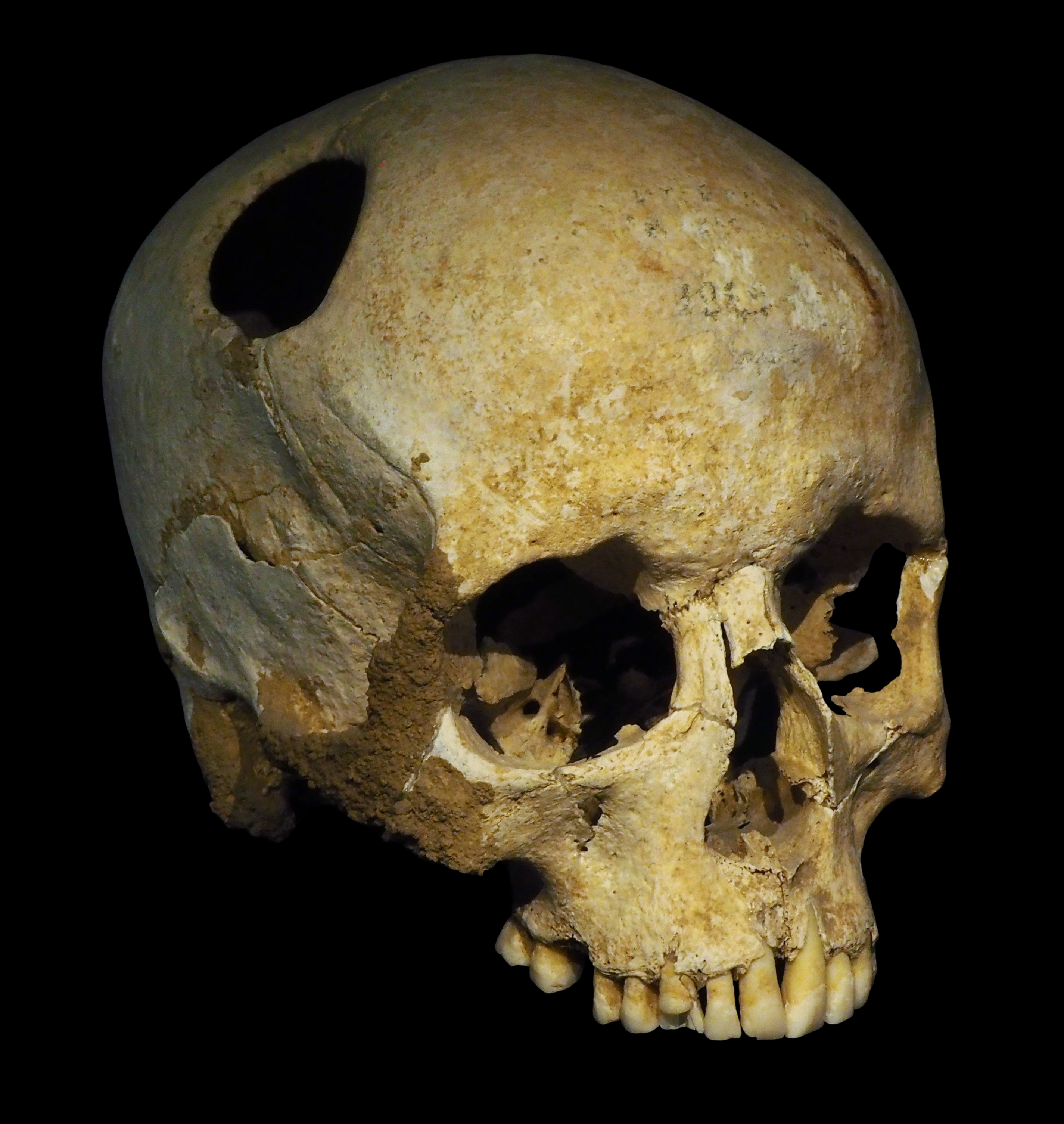
A trepanned skull

The earliest cranioplasty operation is dated to 3000 BC in the Pre-Columbian Peruvian civilisation, where precious metals, gourds, and shells were found next to trepanned skulls in graveyards, suggesting that cranioplasty had been performed. In the Paracas region of present-day Peru, a skull from 2000 BC with a thin plate of gold covering a cranial defect was found. Moreover, defective skulls were found covered with coconut shells or palm leaves in ancient tribes of the Polynesian Islands. Sanan and Haines stated that the materials being used for cranioplasty were associated with the status of the patient.

=== Modern history ===
Research on cranioplasty was not emphasised among early surgical authors in ancient Asia, Egypt, Greece, and Rome, although there were research and practice on trephination in ancient Greece and Rome. More emphasis was placed on developing skills in applying dressing on an open wound.

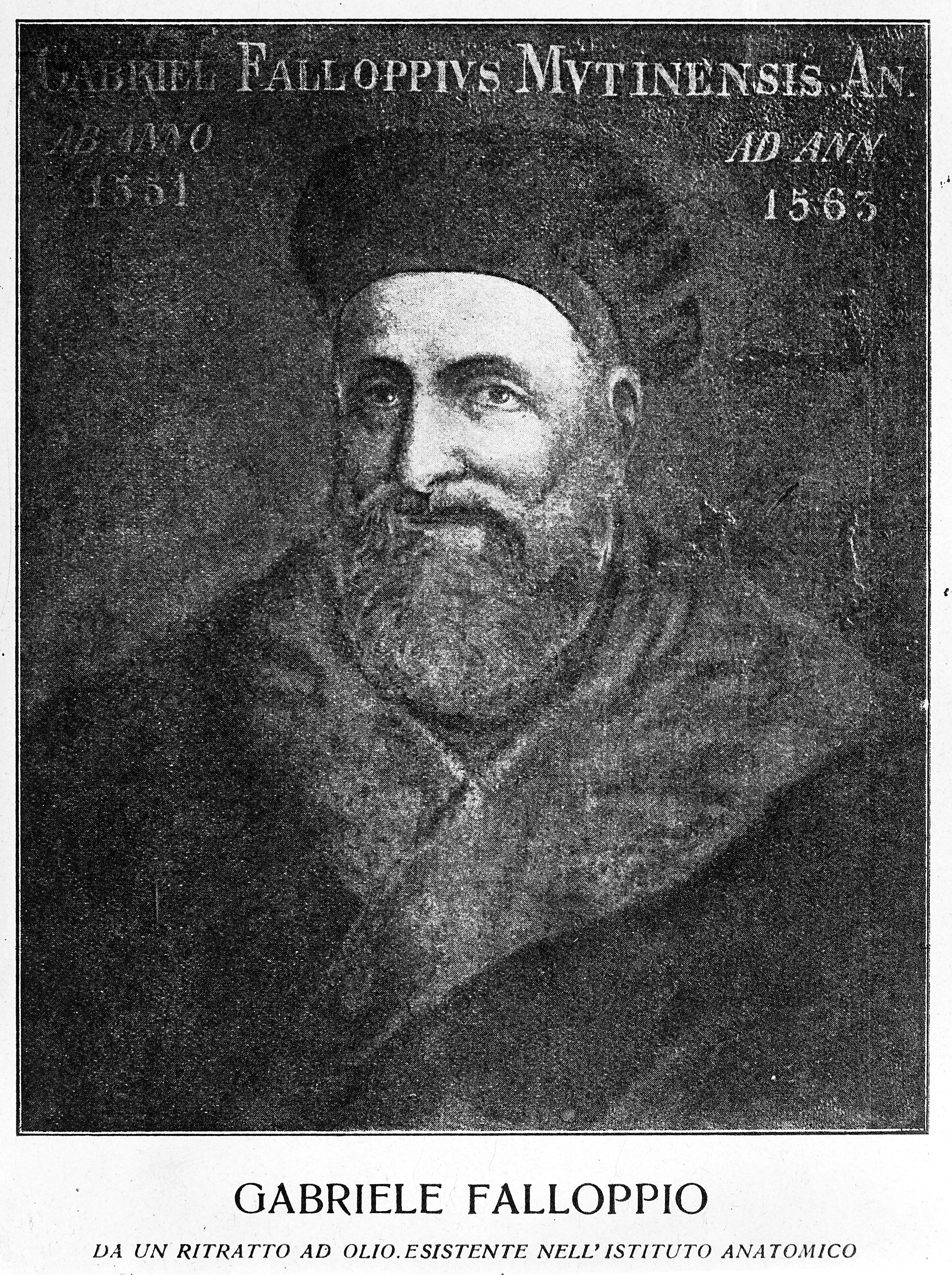
Portrait of Gabriele Fallopius

The earliest modern description of cranioplasty was written by surgeon Ibrahim bin Abdullah of the Ottoman Empire, in his surgical book Alâim-i Cerrâhîn in 1505. The book mentioned the use of xenografts from Kangal dogs or goats as materials for cranioplasty. Such materials were used due to the accessibility of these animals near battlefields, where the procedure is likely to be performed.

The first true description of cranioplasty in Europe was made by Fallopius in the 16th century, stating that the fractured cranium should be removed and be reinserted with a gold plate if the dura was damaged. This was questioned by other practitioners at his time, concerning that surgeons may keep the gold instead of using it for surgery. The first cranioplasty was reported by the Dutch surgeon Job Janszoon van Meekeren. The report described the use of a segment of a canine cranium as a material for cranioplasty on a nobleman in Moscow. The operation was successful, but its use of canine bone was not accepted by the church and the man was forced to leave Russia.

Since the first operation, bones from more animal species were used as xenografts for cranioplasty. These include dogs, apes, geese, rabbits, calves, eagles, oxen, and buffalos. In 1917, William Wayne Babcock reported the use of "soup bone", a piece of cooked and perforated animal bone as a xenograft.

=== Development of modern materials ===
The prevalence of head injuries increased in the 20th century with the advancement of armaments, particularly the use of hand grenades in trench warfare during World War I. Along with a decreased mortality from suffering such injuries due to the development of cell debris removal, wound closing, and the use of antibiotics, cranioplasty techniques were therefore improved. Autografts, allografts and synthetic materials are the main types of materials used for cranioplasty.

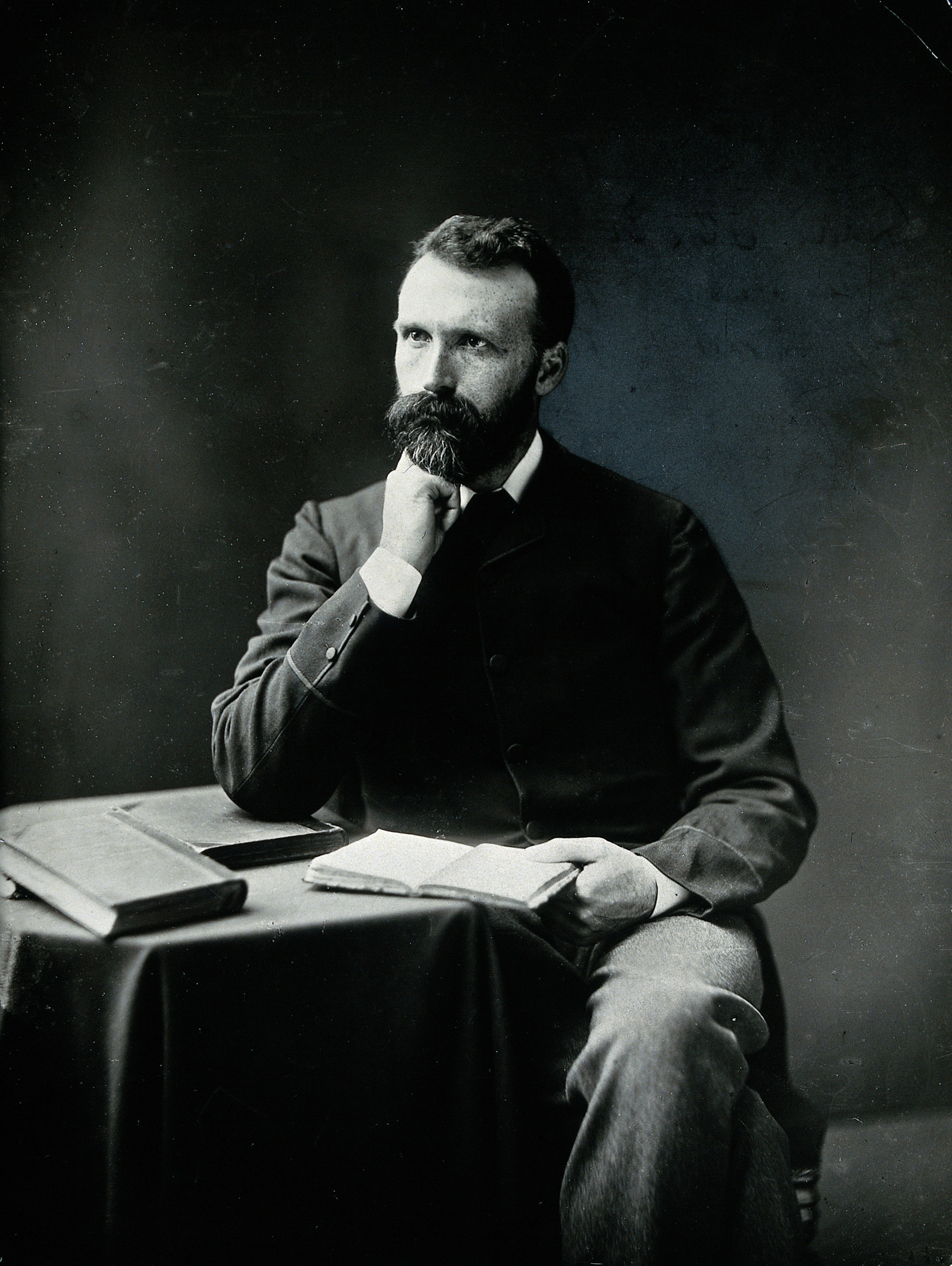
Sir William Macewen, who reported a case of successful autograft cranioplasty in 1885

Autografts, or autologous grafts, are body tissues taken from the patient. The first successful cranioplasty using an autograft was recorded in 1821, with the bone piece being reinserted into the cranium. The operation achieved partial healing. Subsequently, more studies and operations were carried out with autografts. A successful case of reimplantation of cranial bone was reported by Sir William Macewen in 1885, popularising autografts to be material for cranioplasty. Succeeding operations involved autografts taken from different parts of the patient's body, such as the tibia (leg bone), scapula (shoulder blade), ilium (hip bone), sternum (chest bone), along with fat tissues and fascia.

Allografts are tissues from another individual of the same species. The first use of allografts was reported in 1915 with cadaver cartilage by Morestin. Subsequently, another 32 cases of cranioplasties performed with cadaver cartilage were reported by Gosset in 1916. The use of cadaver cartilage was favoured during World War I due to its malleability and resistance to infection. Its use declined because of its lack of significant calcification and strength. Cadaver skull was another type of allograft reported to be used as a cranioplasty material multiple times by Sicard and Dambrin from 1917 to 1919. The material was not favoured due to the high infection rate with its use. In the 1980s, the use of cadaver allograft disc for filling in small holes received a satisfactory result, and there was a resurgence of the use of cadaver bone. However, cadaver bones and allografts, in general, are not the preferred materials in modern operations.

The use of methyl methacrylate (PMMA) for cranioplasty has been developed since World War II, when there was a high demand for it to treat combat injuries, and used extensively since 1954. PMMA becomes malleable when an exothermic reaction occurs between its powder form and benzoyl peroxide, allowing it to be moulded to the cranial defect. Advantages of using it are its malleability, low cost, high strength and high durability. Disadvantages include its vulnerability to infection, as bacteria may adhere to its fibrous layer, as well as its brittle nature and absence of growth potential.

Other common synthetic materials for cranioplasty include titanium and hydroxyapatite. Titanium was first used for cranioplasty in 1965. It can be used as a plate or a mesh and be 3D printed as a porous form. Titanium is non-ferromagnetic and non-corrosive, making the host free from inflammatory reactions. It is also robust, thus preventing patients from trauma. The use of titanium is associated with a lower infection rate. Disadvantages of using titanium include its high cost, poor malleability, and disruption to CT scan images.

Hydroxyapatite is a compound of calcium phosphate being arranged in a hexagonal structure. It bonds well chemically with bones and inflicts little inflammatory reaction by the host, and has good osteointegration. It can be expanded and is used in paediatric cranioplasty. It can be moulded smoothly and has appealing cosmetic results. However, the material is brittle and has low tensile strength, and so is only suitable to be used for small cranial defects. Its use is also associated with a high infection rate. Hydroxyapatite is often used with a titanium mesh to prevent fractures and for better osteointegration.

== See also ==
- Human cranium
- Craniotomy
- Decompressive craniectomy
- Oral and maxillofacial surgery
- Plastic surgery
- Craniofacial surgery
