= Parvathy Hospital =

Hospital

Parvathy Hospital chennai
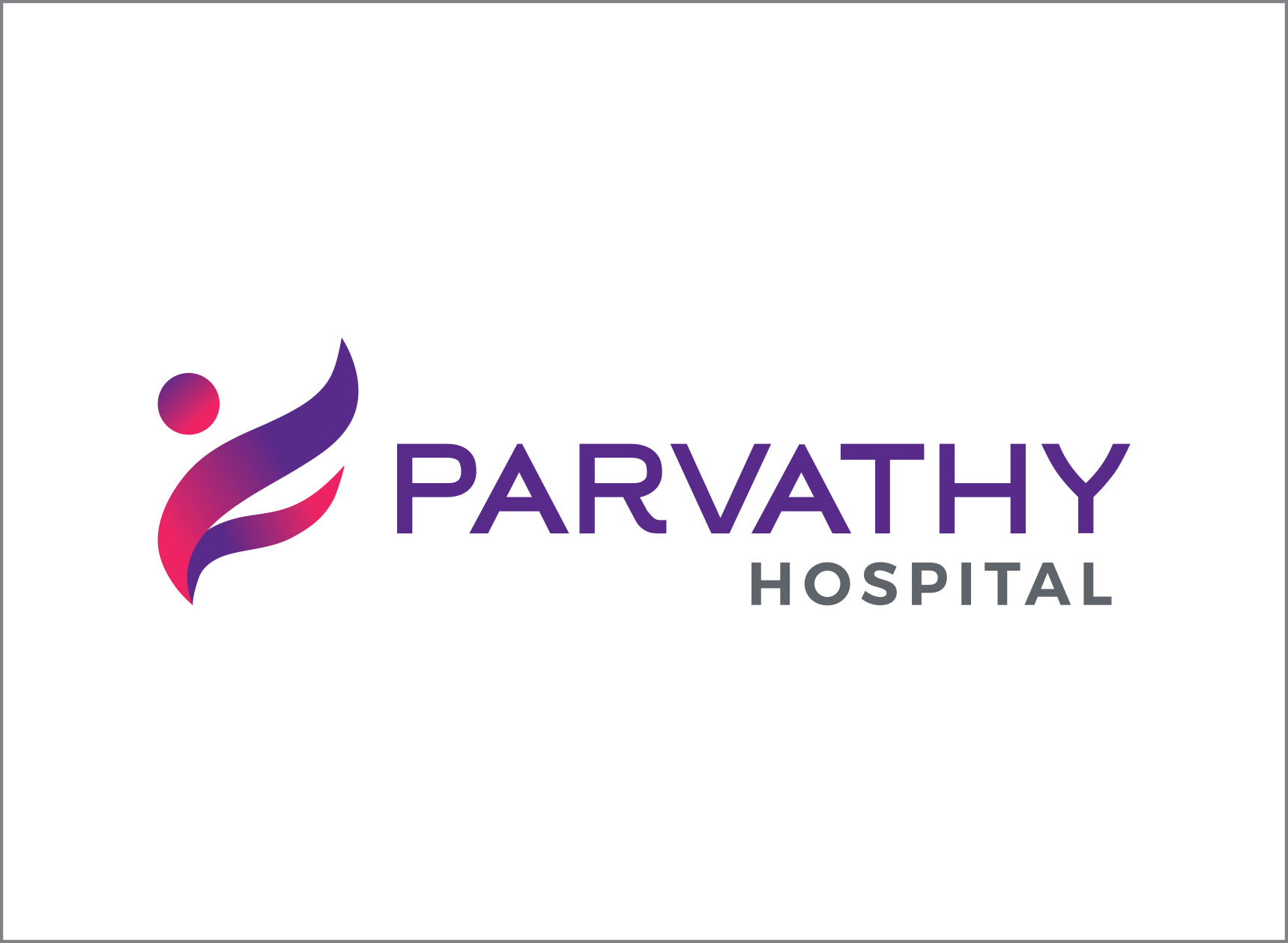
- Type: Private
- Industry: Healthcare
- Founded: 1992 in Chennai, Tamil Nadu, India
- Founder: Dr.S.Muthukumar
- Headquarters: Chennai, Tamil Nadu, India, Chennai, India
- Services: Hospitals, Rehabilation Centre
- Website: www.parvathyhospital.com

Parvathy Hospital is a multi-specialty Indian hospital specializes in Bone and Joint care based in Chennai. It was founded by Dr.S.Muthukumar in 1992.It is fully accredited by the National Accreditation Board for Hospital and Healthcare providers.

== History ==
The hospital was established in 2004 as a 20-bed facility. By 2013, its capacity had increased to 100 beds, and in 2016 it received full accreditation from the National Accreditation Board for Hospitals & Healthcare Providers (NABH).

A computer-navigated hip replacement, claimed by the hospital as the first such procedure in the Asia-Pacific region, was performed in 2011. The following year, the hospital reported that it had carried out 500 navigated knee replacements.

In 2017, the Economic Times presented the hospital with its "Best Asian Healthcare Brand" award. The organization expanded its operations in 2020, opening Parvathy Hospital in Oragadam, Chennai. Two years later, it began offering cardiac and in vitro fertilisation (IVF) treatments.

== Specializations ==
The hospital is specialized in Orthopedics, Ambulance and Emergency Services, Neuro Sciences, Oral and Maxillo Facial Surgery, Plastic and Reconstructive Surgery, Trauma Care, Foot & Ankle, Rheumatology, Spine, Sports medicine, Critical Care, IVF Fertility and Cardiology.

== Awards and achievements ==
- Performed cranioplasty surgery using a newly designed titanium plate to fit the skull of the accident victim of 26 years old.
