= Encephaloduroarteriosynangiosis =

Neurosurgical procedure

- Other names: Encephalo-duro-arterio-synangiosis (EDAS)
- Specialty: Neurology

In medicine, encephaloduroarteriosynangiosis or EDAS is a medical procedure for revascularization of the human brain using neurosurgery, primarily used to treat moyamoya syndrome or severe intracranial atherosclerotic disease, and to help prevent strokes and transient ischemic attacks.

== Procedure ==
Surgeons carefully separate and preserve a section of the superficial temporal artery and surrounding tissue. Afterward, a craniotomy is performed, accessing the brain and exposing the dura mater through a small opening made in the skull. Then, the preserved artery is sutured to the edges of the dura mater and redirected onto the hypoxic portion of the brain's surface. The procedure ends by reattaching the bone flap to the skull, securing it with metal plates.

== Recovery ==
Over several weeks to a year, the body responds to the lack of blood flow by stimulating angiogenesis, which enables the formation of new, healthy blood vessels from the placed artery on the brain's surface.

Patients spend their first night in the ICU, where blood pressure is strictly monitored to prevent strokes while blood vessels regrow, followed by a few days in a regular neuroscience unit. Pain medication is optional, but usually provided to manage soreness and post-operative craniotomy headaches. Antiplatelet medications are typically provided to prevent blood clots during the recovery window.

Young children who undergo EDAS must be prevented from hyperventilation, as rapid breathing can trigger transient ischemic attacks before new blood vessels are fully grown.

Unlike most brain surgeries, EDAS generally does not require rehabilitation.
