= Moyamoya disease =

Disease characterized by constriction of brain arteries

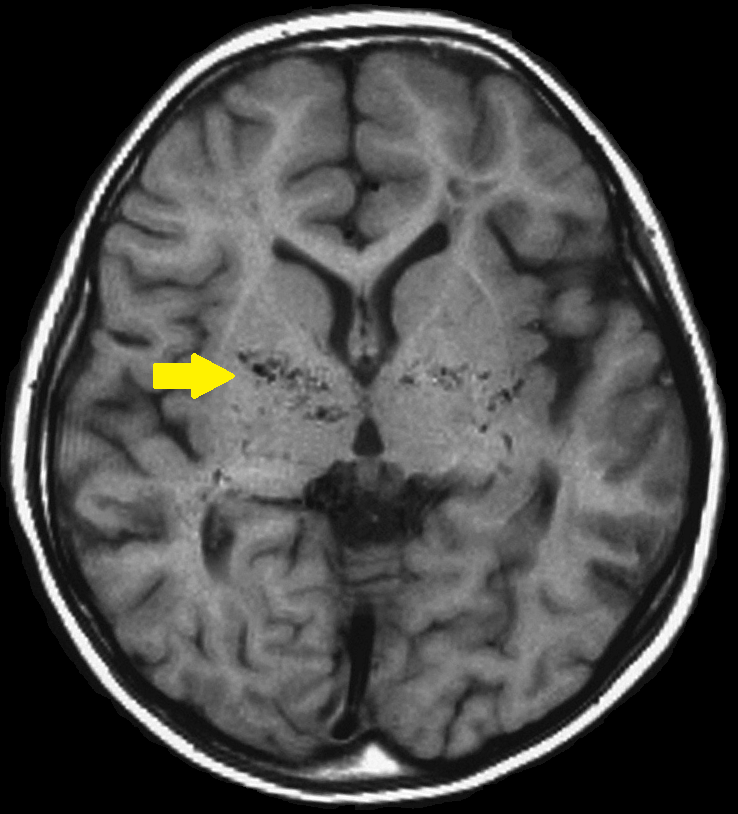
- T1-weighted MR image of moyamoya disease. A flow void in the basal ganglia is indicated by the arrow.
- Specialty: Neurology
- Symptoms: Headache; seizures; weakness; numbness or paralysis in the face, arm or leg (typically unilateral); visual disturbances; aphasia, cognitive or developmental delays, involuntary movements
- Complications: Permanent damage to the brain, seizures, paralysis, vision problems, speech problems, movement disorders, and developmental delays
- Diagnostic method: Magnetic resonance imaging (MRI), computerized tomography (CT) scan, cerebral angiogram, positron emission tomography (PET) scan or single-photon emission computerized tomography (SPECT), electroencephalogram (EEG), transcranial Doppler ultrasound
- Medication: Blood thinners, calcium channel blockers, anticonvulsants

Moyamoya disease is a disease in which certain arteries in the brain are constricted. Blood flow is blocked by constriction and blood clots (thrombosis). A collateral circulation develops around the blocked vessels to compensate for the blockage, but the collateral vessels are small, weak, and prone to bleeding, aneurysm, and thrombosis. On a conventional angiography, these collateral vessels have the appearance of a "puff of smoke", described as moyamoya (もやもや) in Japanese.

When moyamoya is diagnosed, with no underlying correlational conditions, it is diagnosed as moyamoya disease. This is also the case when the arterial constriction and collateral circulation are bilateral. Moyamoya syndrome is a unilateral arterial constriction, or it occurs when one of the several specified conditions is also present. This may also be considered as moyamoya being secondary to the primary condition. Mainly, occlusion of the distal internal carotid artery occurs. On angiography, a "puff of smoke" appearance is seen, and the treatment of choice is surgical bypass.

== Signs and symptoms ==
Patients usually present with TIA, ischemic/hemorrhagic stroke, seizure, or idiopathic and isolated stroke-like symptoms. The age distribution is bimodal, being more common in either young adolescence or mid-forties.

There are no reliable methods to distinguish moyamoya disease from other intracranial vascular diseases. Diagnosis relies on radiologic imaging.

== Cause ==
About 10–15% of cases of moyamoya disease are familial, and some cases result from specific genetic mutations.

=== Known genetic causes ===
Susceptibility to moyamoya disease-2 (MYMY2; 607151) is caused by variation in the RNF213 gene (613768) on the long arm of chromosome 17 (17q25), although evidence suggests that RNF213 mutation alone is not enough to cause disease. Moyamoya disease-5 (MYMY5; 614042) is caused by mutation in the ACTA2 gene (102620) on the long arm of chromosome 10 (10q23.3); and moyamoya disease-6 with achalasia (MYMY6; 615750) is caused by mutation in the GUCY1A3 gene (139396) on the long arm of chromosome 4 (4q32). Loci for the disorder have been mapped to the short arm of chromosome 3 (MYMY1) and the long arm of chromosome 8 (8q23) (MYMY3; 608796). See also MYMY4 (300845), an X-linked recessive syndromic disorder characterized by moyamoya disease, short stature, hypergonadotropic hypogonadism, and facial dysmorphism, and linked to q25.3, on chromosome 17.

=== Molecular mechanisms ===
Both familial and sporadic moyamoya diseases have unclear molecular causes. Inflammatory cytokines and matrix metalloproteinases have been proposed as contributory factors, though the mechanism and significance of observed associations with these molecules are unknown. Researchers also frequently target known contributors to fibrotic and angiogenic changes, such as FGF and TGF-beta, but no conclusive causes have been found.

=== Clinically similar conditions ===
Some hemoglobinopathies, such as sickle cell disease, are known to cause a syndrome which is clinically similar to moyamoya disease, but which is due to occlusion of cerebral arteries, rather than constriction of them. Rarely, atherosclerotic changes in distal intracranial carotid arteries may also cause a vasooclusive form of moyamoya.

== Pathophysiology ==
The disease moyamoya, a Japanese mimetic word, gets its characteristic name due to the appearance of smoke on relevant angiographs resultant from the tangle of tiny vessels in response to stenosis. This makes the blood leak out of the arteries, causing pressure on the brain and subsequent headaches. Over the last six decades, since the disease was first described, the pathogenesis of moyamoya disease has remained elusive, although the gene ring finger protein 213 (RNF213) has been implicated. In September 2021, a south Indian researcher has proposed a pathbreaking theory on moyamoya pathogenesis. Coined the "Mechano-biological theory", the disease has a multifactorial pathogenesis. The authors explain the occurrence of the moyamoya phenomenon in the idiopathic and syndromic variants. In short, the authors report that moyamoya disease likely occurs due to several factors (e.g., differences in vascular anatomy) that ultimately contribute to broad cerebral blood vessel occlusion and consequent shifts in vessel connections to try to provide blood for the compromised brain.

Once it begins, the vascular occlusion tends to continue despite any known medical management. In some people, this leads to transient ischemic attacks or repeated strokes with severe functional impairment or even death. In others, the blockage may not cause any symptoms.

The disease primarily constricts the internal carotid artery, and often extends to the middle and anterior cerebral arteries, branches of the internal carotid artery within the skull. When the internal carotid artery becomes completely blocked, the fine collateral circulation that it supplies is obliterated. Patients often survive on the collateral circulation from the back (posterior) of the circle of Willis, arising from the basilar artery.

The arterial constrictions in moyamoya disease differ from the constrictions in atherosclerosis. In atherosclerosis, the walls of arteries are damaged, leading to the deposition of fat and immune cells, and ultimately the accumulation of immune cells laden with fat. In moyamoya, the inner layer of the carotid artery proliferates within the arterial lumen. The artery also fills with blood clots, which may cause strokes.

Moyamoya disease tends to affect adults in the third to fourth decade of life. In children, it tends to cause strokes or seizures. In adults, it tends to cause strokes or bleeding. The clinical features are strokes, recurrent transient ischemic attacks (TIAs), sensorimotor paralysis (numbness and paralysis of the extremities), convulsions, and/or migraine-like headaches. Moreover, following a stroke, secondary bleeding may occur. Such bleeding, called hemorrhagic strokes, may also stem from rupture of the weak neovascular vessel walls.

== Diagnosis ==
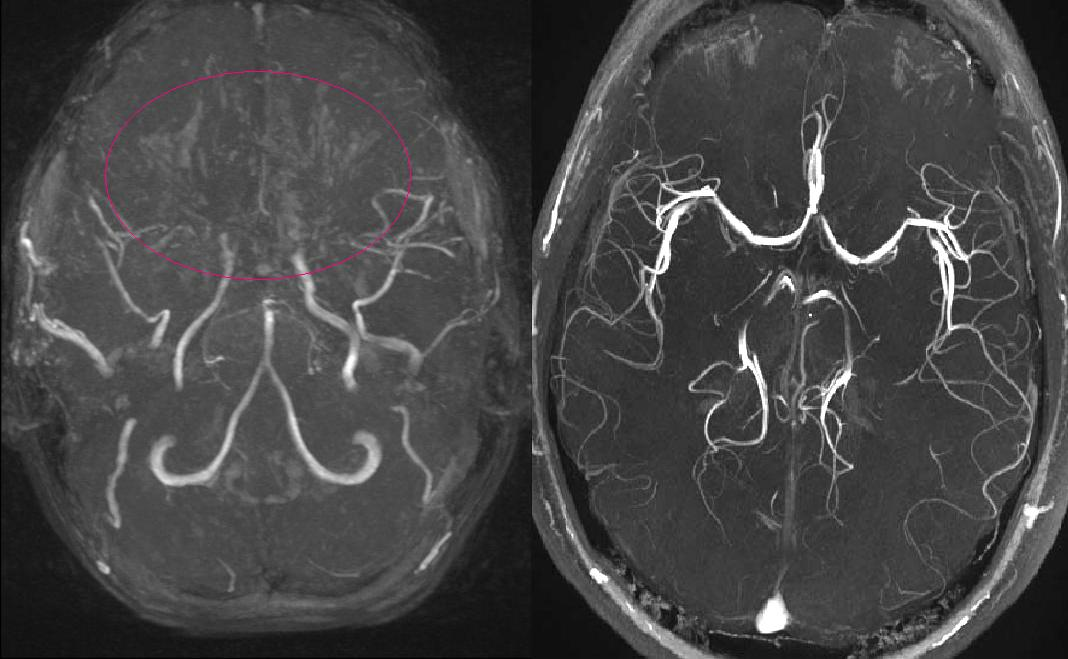
Left: MIP reconstructed MR angiography of a 11-year-old girl with moyamoya disease. Right: healthy patient, for comparison.

Cerebral angiography is the gold standard for diagnosing moyamoya disease and its progression. According to Suzuki's system, it can be classified into six stages:

- Stage 1 Narrowing of the carotid fork
- Stage 2: Initiation of the moyamoya and dilatation of the intracranial main arteries
- Stage 3 Intensification of the moyamoya and defects of the anterior cerebral artery and middle cerebral artery
- Stage 4 Minimization of the moyamoya and defects of the posterior cerebral artery
- Stage 5 Reduction of the moyamoya and development of external carotid artery collaterals
- Stage 6: Disappearance of the moyamoya and circulation only via the external carotid artery and vertebral artery

Magnetic resonance angiography (MRA) is also useful in diagnosing the disease with good correlation with Suzuki's grading system.

Proliferation of smooth muscle cells in the walls of the moyamoya-affected arteries is representative of the disease. A study of six autopsies of six patients who died from moyamoya disease led to the finding that there is evidence that supports the theory that there is a thickening, or proliferation, of the innermost layer of the vessels affected by moyamoya. These vessels are the ACA (anterior cerebral artery), MCA (middle cerebral artery), and ICA (internal carotid artery). The occlusion of the ICA results in concomitant diminution of the "puff-of-smoke" collaterals, as they are supplied by the ICA.

Often, nuclear medicine studies such as SPECT (single-photon emission computed tomography) are used to demonstrate the decreased blood and oxygen supply to areas of the brain involved with moyamoya disease. Conventional cerebral angiography provides the conclusive diagnosis of moyamoya disease in most cases and should be performed before any surgical considerations.

Darren B. Orbach explains how moyamoya disease progresses and the role angiography plays in detecting its progression in a short video. In 2019, author and artist Sarah Lippett published a graphic novel about her decade-long struggle to get a diagnosis and treatment for moyamoya disease, called A Puff of Smoke (published with Jonathan Cape). The book was praised in the newspaper The Guardian as a "wonderfully drawn memoir of a serious childhood illness." It was one of the paper's "graphic novels of the year" in 2019 and The Observer newspaper's graphic novel of the month in November 2019.

=== Associated biomarkers ===
Smith (2015) conducted a study of specific biological markers that correlate with moyamoya disease. Some of the categories of these biomarkers include phenotypes – conditions commonly related to moyamoya, radiographical markers for the diagnosis of moyamoya, and proteins, as well as cellular changes that occur in cases of moyamoya.

Similar to moyamoya disease, certain conditions are closely associated with it. Some of the more common medical conditions that are closely associated with moyamoya disease include trisomy 21 (Down syndrome), sickle cell disease, and neurofibromatosis type 1. There is also evidence that suggests hyperthyroidism and congenital dwarfing syndromes are two more loosely associated syndromes that correlate with moyamoya disease later in life.

Research has shown that certain radiographic biomarkers help diagnose moyamoya disease. The specific radiographic markers are now considered an acceptable key component of moyamoya disease and have been added to the International Classification of Diseases (ICD). These biomarkers of moyamoya are "stenosis of the distal ICA's up to and including the bifurcation, along with segments of the proximal ACA and MCA...dilated basal collateral vessels must be present" Some other common findings that have not been added to the classification index of those with moyamoya disease which are found using radiography involve very distinct changes in the vessels of the brain. These changes include newly formed vessels made to compensate for another change noted, ischemia and cerebrovascular reserve, both found on MRI. Functional changes include evidence of ischemia in the brain blood vessels (ICA, ACA, and MCA, specifically). It is also important to note that for radiographic biomarkers to be classified as moyamoya disease, all findings must be bilateral. If this is not the case and the findings are unilateral, it is diagnosed as moyamoya syndrome. This recently changed in 2021, as the Research Committee of Moyamoya Disease (RCMD) has "removed limitations of the previous definition that required bilateral involvement of the intracranial carotid artery. Now, proximal middle cerebral artery or anterior cerebral artery involvement suffices, and unilateral disease is acceptable to make the diagnosis, given the increasing evidence of progression to bilateral involvement in unilateral MMD."

Several protein biomarkers have been linked to moyamoya disease. Although the sample sizes of the studies performed are small due to the rarity of the disease, the findings indicate a correlation between the disease and several specific protein biomarkers. Other studies have confirmed the correlation of moyamoya and adhesion molecule 1 (ICAM-1) being increased as compared to normal vascular function counterparts. Furthermore, it has been concluded that the localization of inflammatory cells suggests that the inflammation stimulus itself may be responsible for the proliferation and occlusion in the ICA, ACA, and MCA found in those with moyamoya disease.

== Treatment ==
Antiplatelet drugs (including aspirin) are usually given to prevent clots, but surgery is usually recommended. Because moyamoya tends to affect only the internal carotid artery and nearby sections of the adjacent anterior and middle cerebral arteries, surgeons can direct other arteries, such as the external carotid artery or the superficial temporal artery, to replace its circulation. The arteries are either sewn directly into the brain circulation or placed on the surface of the brain to reestablish new circulation after a few weeks.

Many operations have been developed for the condition, but currently the most favored are the indirect procedures EDAS, EMS, and multiple burr holes, and the direct procedure STA-MCA. Combined revascularisation procedure, which includes both the direct superficial temporal artery (STA) to middle cerebral artery (MCA) bypass (also known as ECIC bypass), performed with a combination of indirect procedures, is considered the treatment of choice. Although its efficacy, particularly for hemorrhagic disease, remains uncertain, the procedure is thought to reduce the hemodynamic burden on the engorged collateral blood vessels. Multiple burr holes have been used in the frontal and parietal lobes with good neovascularisation achieved.

Indirect Procedures

The EDAS (encephaloduroarteriosynangiosis) procedure is a synangiosis procedure that requires dissection of a scalp artery over a course of several centimeters and then making a small temporary opening in the skull directly beneath the artery. The artery is then sutured to a branch of the middle cerebral artery on the surface of the brain, and the bone is replaced.

In the EMS (encephalomyosynangiosis) procedure, the temporalis muscle, which is located in the temple region of the forehead, is dissected and, through an opening in the skull, placed onto the surface of the brain.

In the multiple burr holes procedure, multiple small holes (burr holes) are placed in the skull to allow for the growth of new vessels into the brain from the scalp.

Direct Procedures

In the STA-MCA procedure, the scalp artery (superficial temporal artery or STA) is directly sutured to an artery on the surface of the brain (middle cerebral artery or MCA). This procedure is also commonly referred to as an EC-IC (External Carotid-Internal Carotid) bypass.

All of these operations have in common the concept of a blood and oxygen-starved brain reaching out to grasp and develop new and more efficient means of bringing blood to the brain and bypassing the areas of blockage. The modified direct anastomosis and encephalo-myo-arterio-synangiosis play a role in this improvement by increasing cerebral blood flow (CBF) after the operation. A significant correlation is found between the postoperative effect and the stages of preoperative angiograms. It is crucial for surgery that the anesthesiologist has experience in managing children being treated for moyamoya, as the type of anesthesia they require is very different from the standard anesthetic children get for almost any other type of neurosurgical procedure.

== Prognosis ==
The natural history of this disorder is not well known. The long-term outlook for patients with treated moyamoya seems to be good when direct bypass is used. Although symptoms may seem to improve almost immediately after the in-direct EDAS, EMS, and multiple burr holes surgeries, it will take probably 6 to 12 months before new vessels can develop to give a sufficient blood supply. With the direct STA-MCA surgery, increased blood supply is immediate.

Once a major stroke or bleeding takes place, even with treatment, the patient may be left with permanent loss of function, so it is very important to treat this condition promptly.

== Epidemiology ==
In the United States, moyamoya has an incidence rate of 0.086 per 100,000. In Japan the overall incidence is higher (0.35 per 100,000). In North America, women in the third or fourth decade of life are most often affected. The condition may also occur during infancy or childhood. These women frequently experience transient ischaemic attacks (TIA), cerebral hemorrhage, or may not experience any symptoms at all. They have a higher risk of recurrent stroke and may be experiencing a distinct underlying pathophysiology compared to patients from Japan.

Moyamoya disease can be either congenital or acquired. Patients with Down syndrome, sickle cell anemia, neurofibromatosis type 1, congenital heart disease, fibromuscular dysplasia, activated protein C resistance, or head trauma can develop moyamoya malformations. It is more common in women than in men; about a third of those affected are male.

== Research ==
In June 2008, a case report established that both moyamoya disease and arteriovenous fistulas (AVFs) of the lining of the brain, the dura mater, are associated with dural angiogenesis. These factors may represent a mechanism of ischemia contributing to the formation of dural AVFs. At least one case of simultaneous unilateral moyamoya syndrome and ipsilateral dural arteriovenous fistula has been reported at the Barrow Neurological Institute. In this case, a 44-year-old man presented with headache, tinnitus, and an intraventricular hemorrhage, as seen on computed tomographic scans. Cerebral angiography showed a right moyamoya pattern and an ipsilateral dural AVF fed by branches of the external carotid artery and draining into the transverse sinus. This extremely rare coincidental presentation may have deeper pathogenic implications.

Research into the pathogenesis of moyamoya disease has found a breakthrough with the proposal of a "Mechano-biological theory" of disease pathogenesis. A research group in southern India has proposed this unifying theory based on computational fluid dynamics studies and longitudinal data. This proposal unifies the pathogenesis of moyamoya disease and moyamoya syndromes described in the literature under a single mechanism.
