= Cranial drill =

Tool for drilling holes in the skull

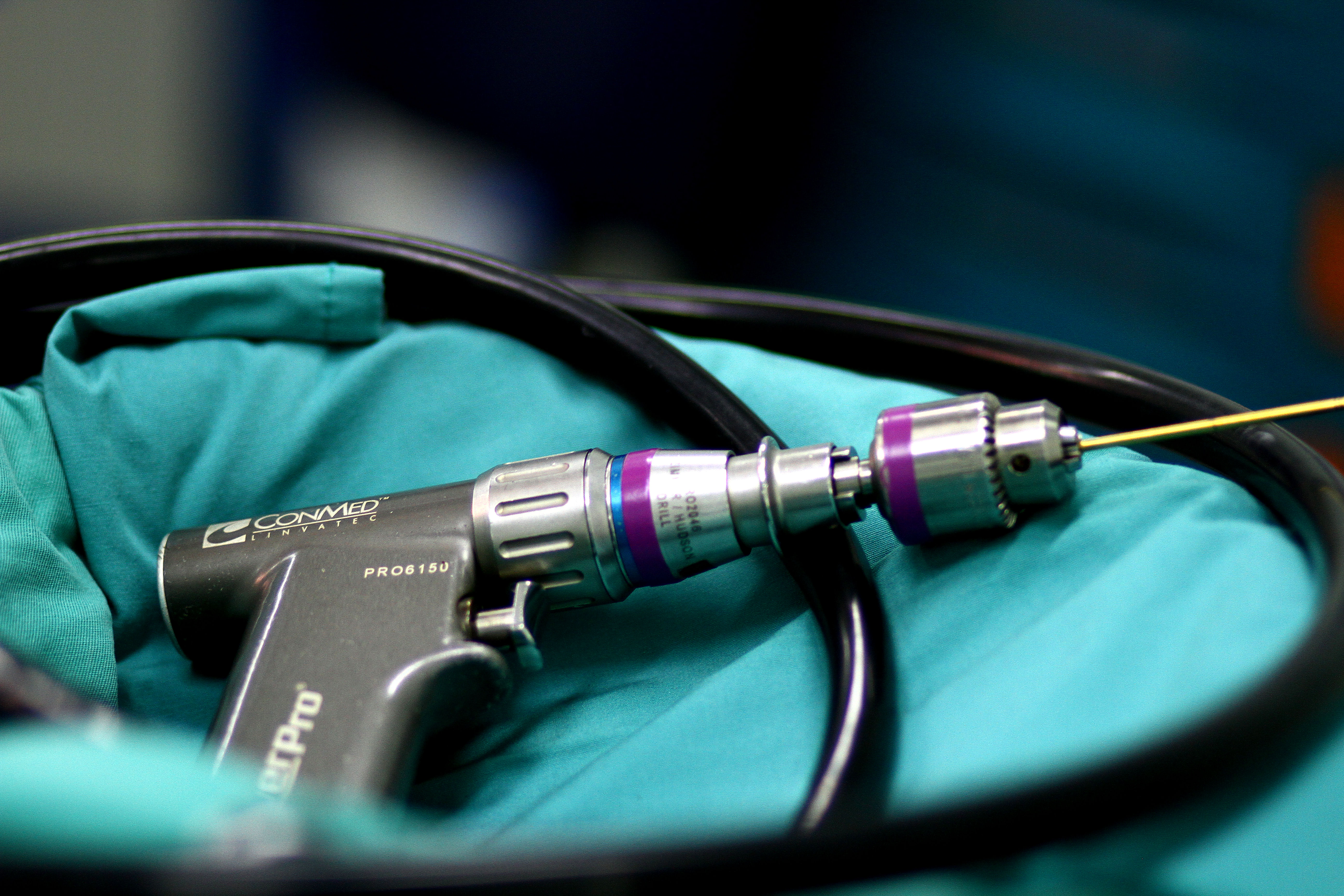
- High-speed pneumatic surgical drill with cranial drill bit

Occupation
- Activity sectors: Surgery, craniotomy, craniectomy

Description
- Fields of employment: Hospitals, clinics, emergency medicine

A cranial drill, also known as a craniotome, is a tool for drilling simple burr holes (trepanation) or for creating larger openings in the skull. This exposes the brain and allows operations such as craniotomy and craniectomy to be done. The drill itself can be manually or electrically driven, and primarily consists of a handpiece and a drill bit, which is a sharp tool that has a form similar to Archimedes' screw; this instrument must be inserted into the drill chuck to perform holes and remove materials. The trepanation tool is generally equipped with a clutch which automatically disengages once it touches a softer tissue, thus preventing tears in the dura mater. For larger openings, the craniotome is an instrument that has replaced manually pulled saw wires in craniotomies from the 1980s.

== History ==
=== Cranial drill ===
The oldest evidence of a hole being applied on a human's brain with a drill dates from c. 4000 B.C. The oldest cranial drilling instrument was found in France, and subsequent use was evidenced by the Ancient Romans, Egyptians, and in Trepanation in Mesoamerica. The practice of trepanning is also evidenced in Ancient Greece, North and South America, Africa, Polynesia and the Far East. The conceivable reasons why ancient humans developed the technique of drilling the head could be religious, ritual or medical factors. The first trepanning procedure consisted of different types of tools and techniques: at the beginning the only material that was available for use, it was a sharp and carved rock. The development of The Hippocratic Corpus, written in the fifth century B.C., is the first written source that can be found about trepanning. The aim of the procedure described in "On Wounds in the Head" was to allow the stagnant blood to escape from the head through a hole. The drill that was used at the time is similar to modern ones but was operated by hand rotation.

In the 15th century, people began to believe that drilling was a cure for mental problems due to a magical stone of madness or stone of folly in the head, which had to be removed. Paintings that portray this practice exist, the most significant ones include The Extraction of the Stone of Madness c. 1488–1516 by Hieronymus Bosch and A Surgeon Extracting the Stone of Folly by Pieter Huys.

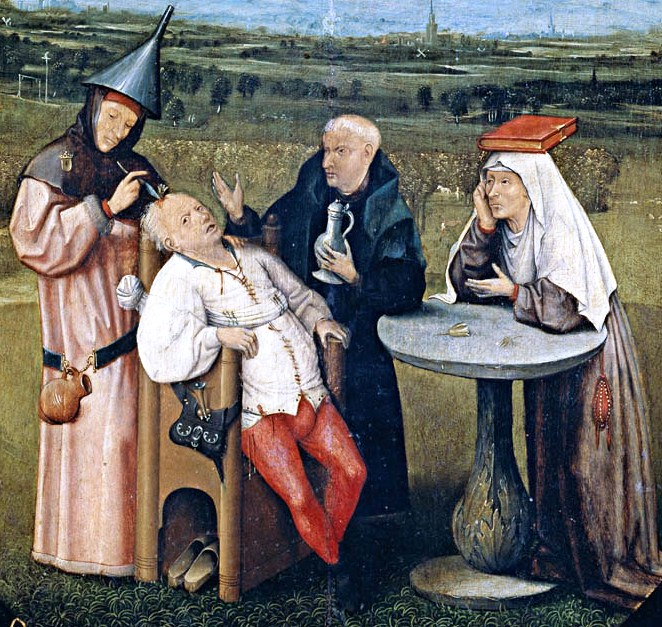
The Extraction of the Stone of Madness, Hieronymus Bosch

From the Renaissance ages, cranial drilling continued to evolve and surgical practice was used less due to the high mortality rate. It was used only for some interventions, such as the treatment of hemorrhages, depressed fractures and penetrating the head. Also, the name for the surgery changed from trepanning to craniotomy.

In the late 1860s, the archaeologist E.G. Squier discovered a skull in an ancient Inca cemetery. This specific skull was anticipated to be of the pre-Columbian era. The skull exhibited a large rectangle-shaped hole on the top. The skull was brought it back to the United States, and his findings were presented to the New York Academy of Medicine. Squier argued that the brain was injected with a tool called a burin which was used on woods and metals before. Traces showed human hand prints. He concluded that the skull and brain evidenced recovery from prehistoric brain surgery, potentially prolonging the patient's life.

Metallurgy was a technique that allowed the use of saws and scalpels. Other cultures came about experimenting through the usage of glass.

== Application ==
A cranial drill is currently used for neurosurgery operations. The procedure of trepanning is applied to patients who suffer, for example, a traumatic brain injury or a stroke. In these cases, it might be necessary to drill a hole in the skull to be able to access the dura mater or the brain itself, and to relieve brain pressure or blood clots. With the use of modern types of cranial drills, surgeons are able to create holes in the bone structure without traumatizing underlying brain tissue. The drill's working tooltip consists of a spiral blade that is framed by a guard device with an angled cranium guide that rests against the inner layer of the skull bone. The dura guard pushes the dura mater downward while the craniotome is moved forward thus preventing dural tearing.

== Types and design ==
A cranial drill is an essential instrument used by surgeons to drill into the skull bone. Various types of drills are used by surgeons for the craniotomy, or oral surgeries. The cranial drill can be differentiated by the examinations of what kind of surgery have to be performed. They can be manually operated, operated by electricity, or by pneumatic motors.

=== Manual cranial drill ===
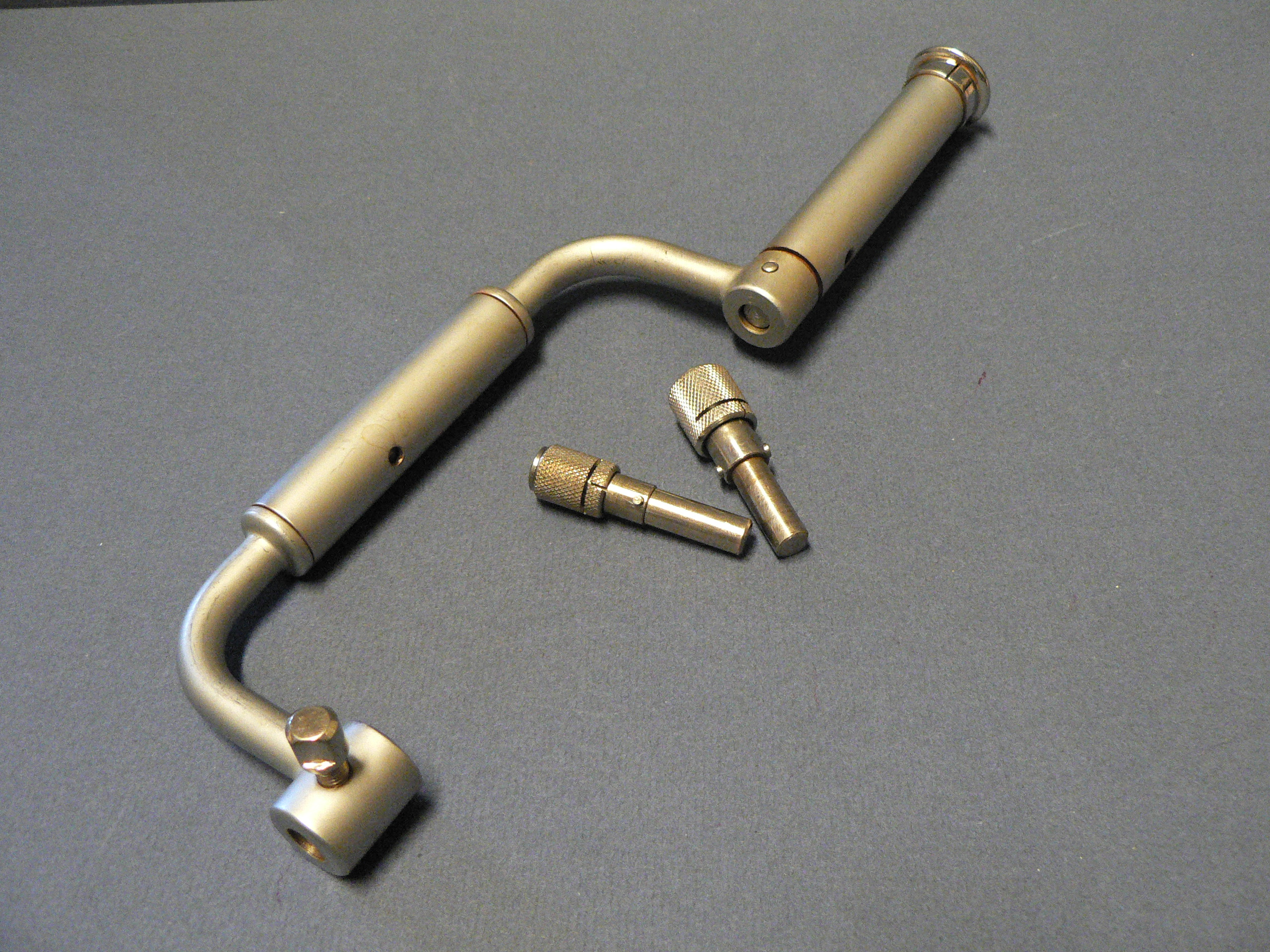
Vilebrequin – Musée des Hospices civils de Lyon, Manual drill

The rotating crank is typically connected to several cogs that set pressure on the skull. This specific drill is not connected to any external power and is used very little in today's operations. The manual cranial drill is the most used and predominant type of drill in surgery, and performs manually. It has an adjusted stopper based on the setting and where the bone is thickest to prevent plunging. Surgeons use this drill manually without any other procedures, and can require substantial upper-body strength.

=== Electric cranial drill ===
The electric cranial drill is powered either by a battery or by electricity via wall sockets.

=== Pneumatic cranial drill ===
The pneumatic motor is known for its great speed, which makes surgery much easier and faster. It is driven by expanding compressed air. The use of this kind of mechanism has many advantages such as the ease of use through high peak velocities. Thanks to superior torque, this system has great performance and it is essential for complex revision operations. The surgical procedure is shorter than usual, so patients spend less time under anesthesia. Pneumatic high-speed craniotomes usually run at 40,000 to 80,000 rpm and have greatly facilitated intracranial approaches in neurosurgery. They are also employed to temporarily remove the vertebral arch in laminotomy.

== Scientific progress ==
Technological progress to reduce surgery time and minimize risks for patients during surgery have been introduced in the field of cranial drills, primarily from machining.

=== CAD/CAM ===
CAD/CAM stands for computer-aided design/computer-aided manufacturing. In the medical field, as well, it is used by surgeons to simplify and ease surgeries: in the case of trepanning, a processor collects information from 2D images and then turns them into 3D images. The processor codifies this information so that the drill can, without any trouble, pierce the correct portion of the skull.

== Photo gallery ==
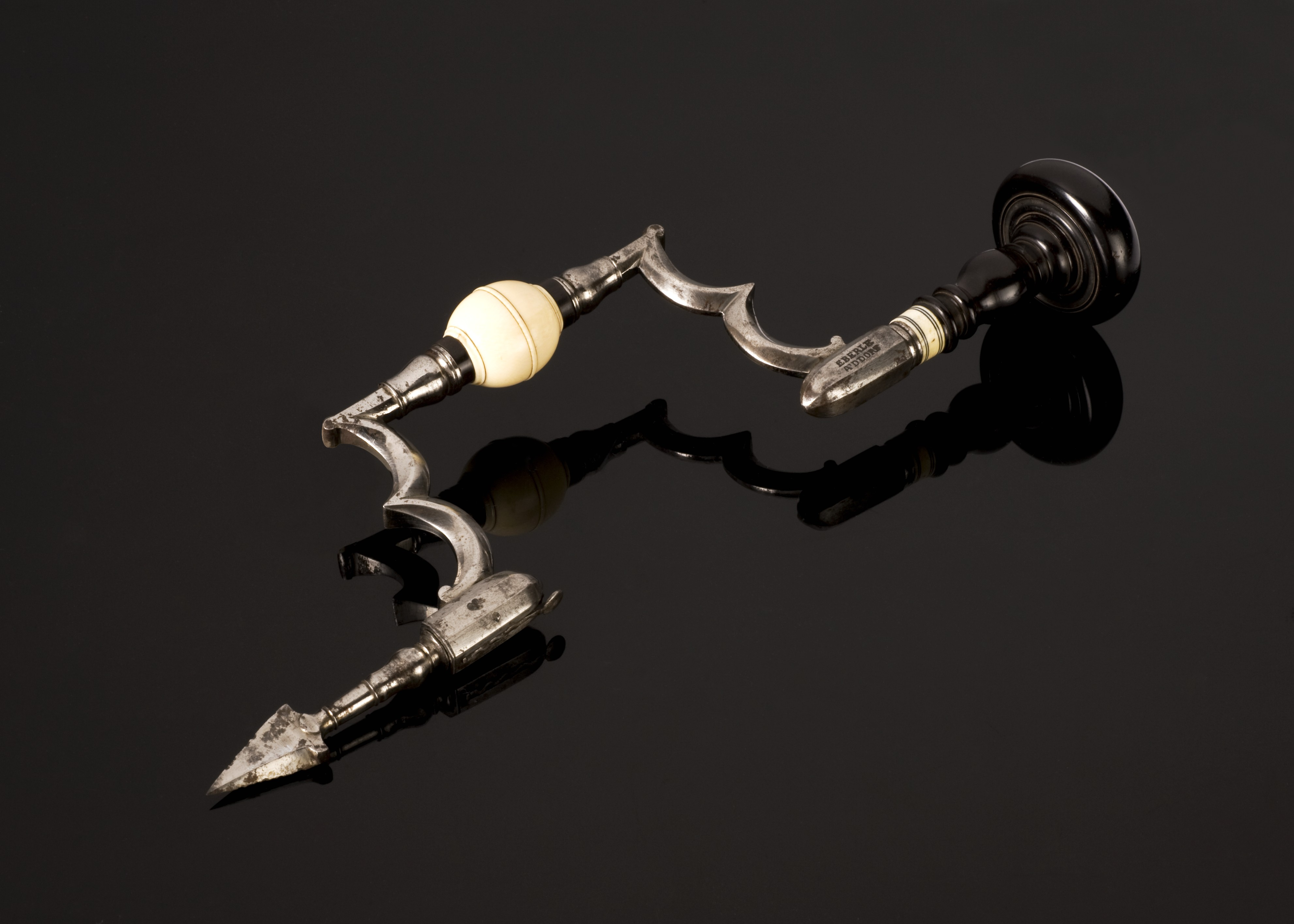
Manual drill during the 18th century

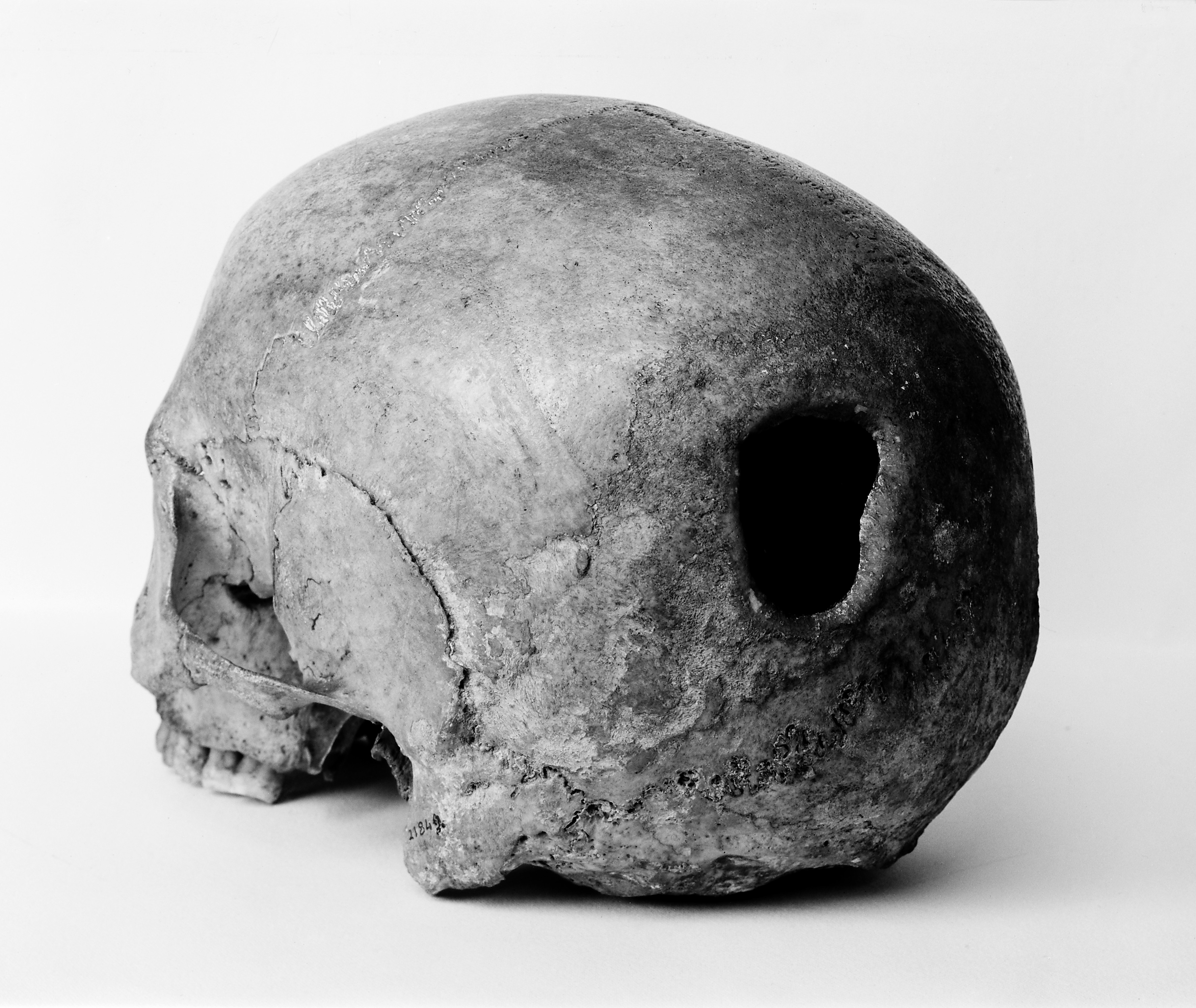
Edinburgh Skull, showing trepanning hole in back of skull

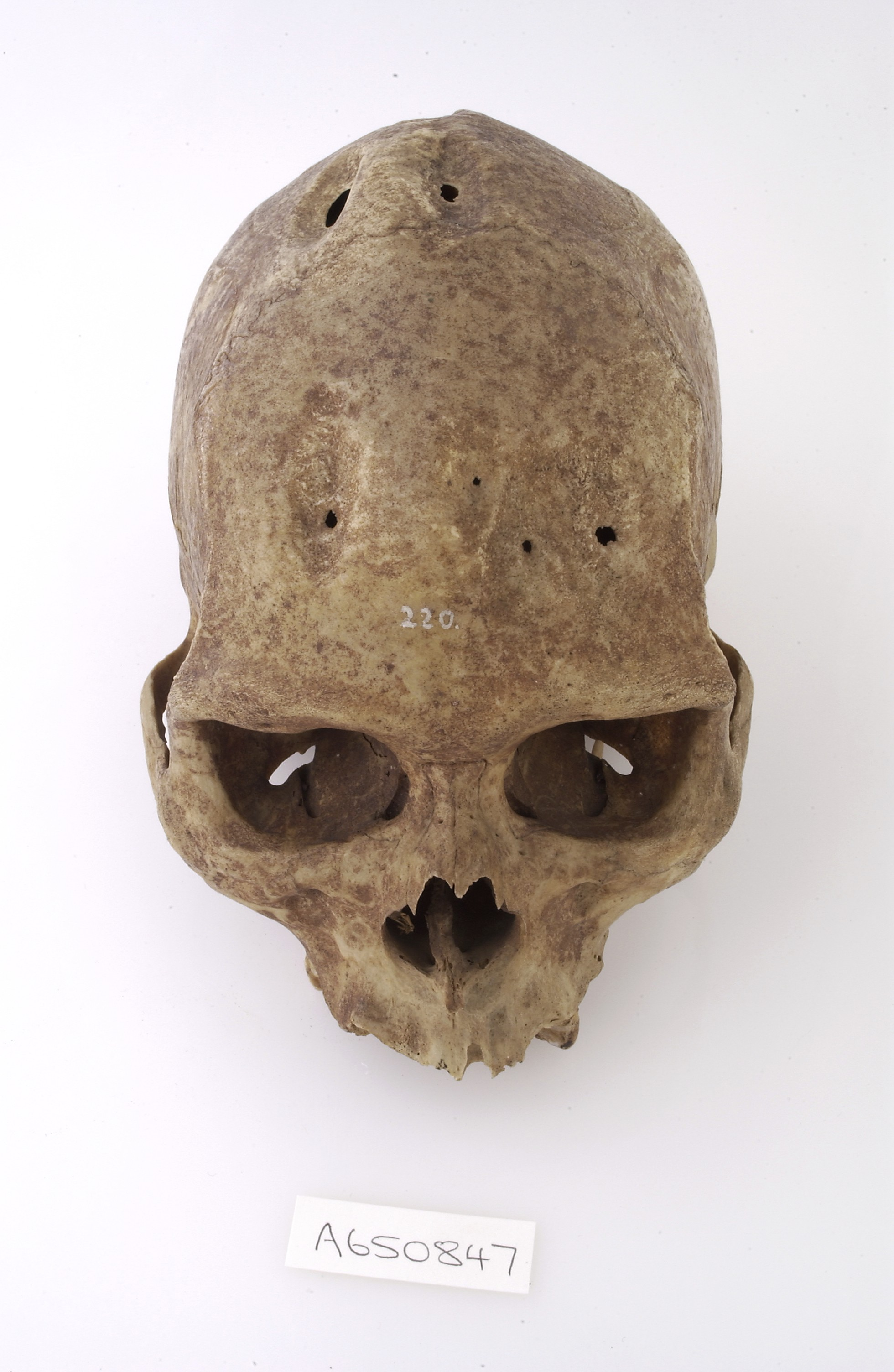
A human skull showing signs of trepanning

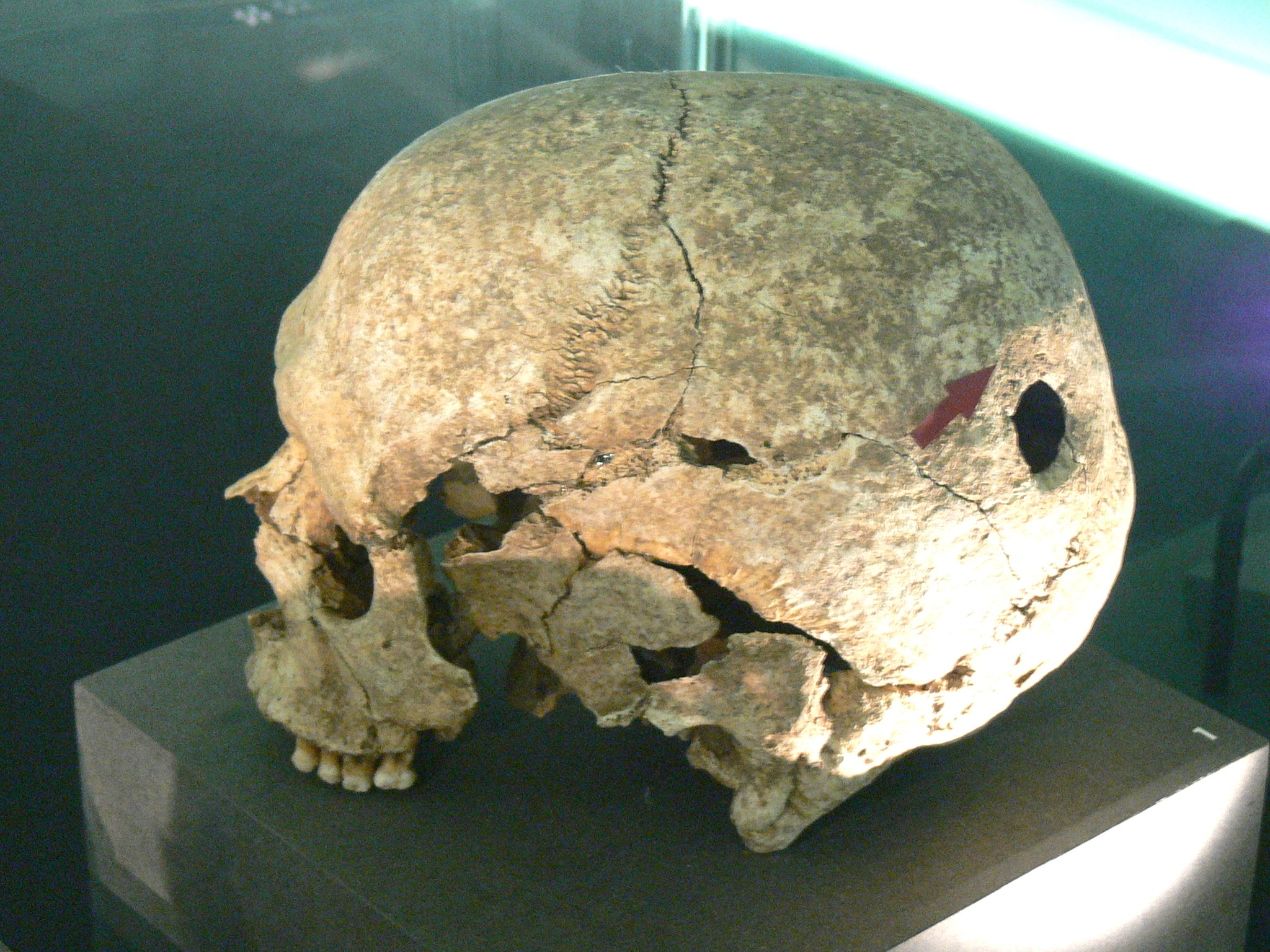
Human skull with trepanation, Celtic museum in Hallein (Salzburg)

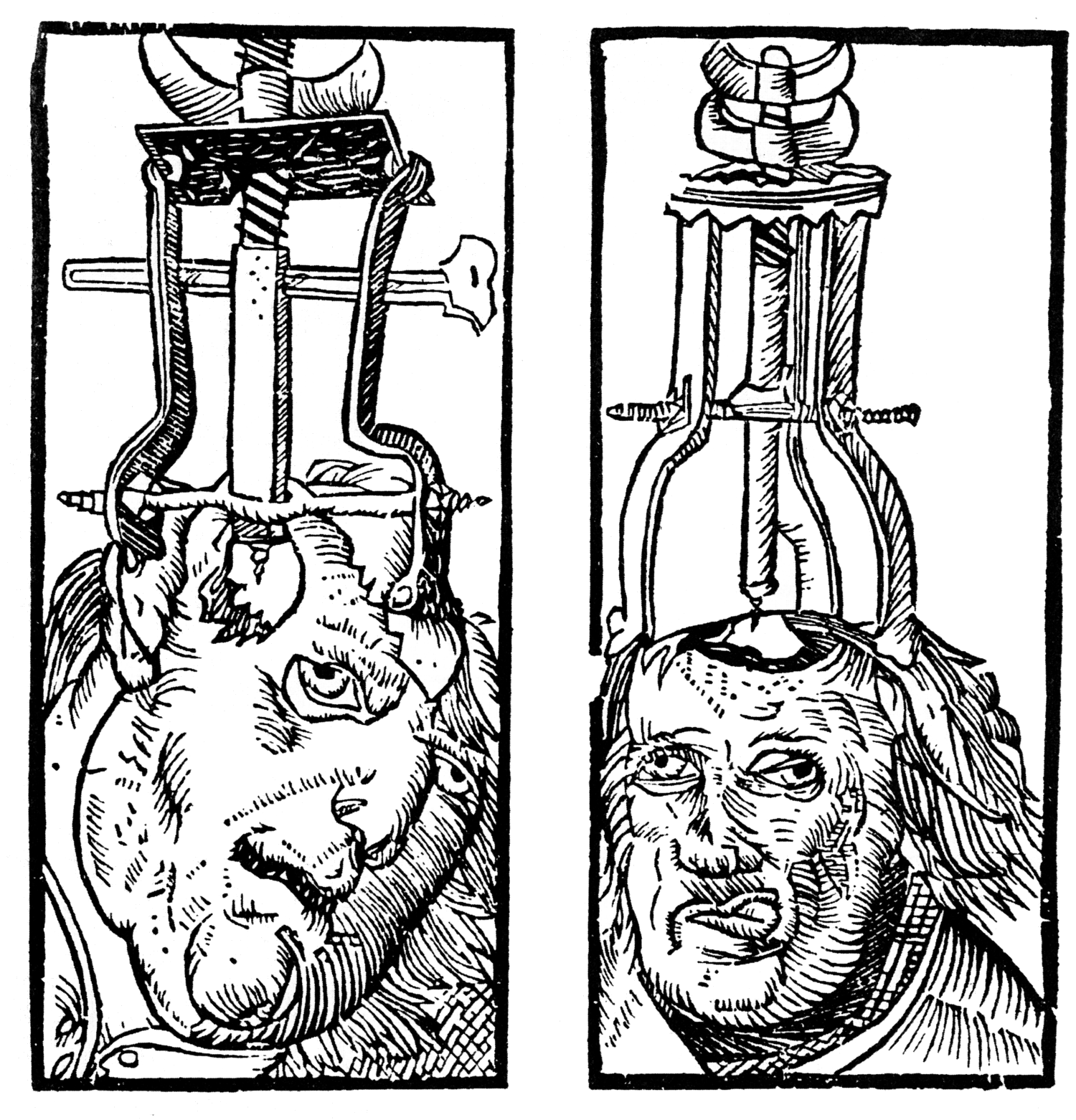
Engraving by Peter Treveris of a trepanation. From Heironymus von Braunschweig's Handywarke of surgeri

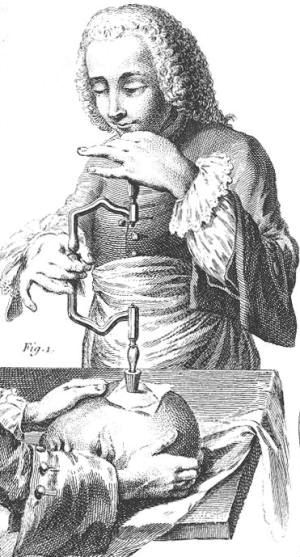
Trepanation illustration France 1800s

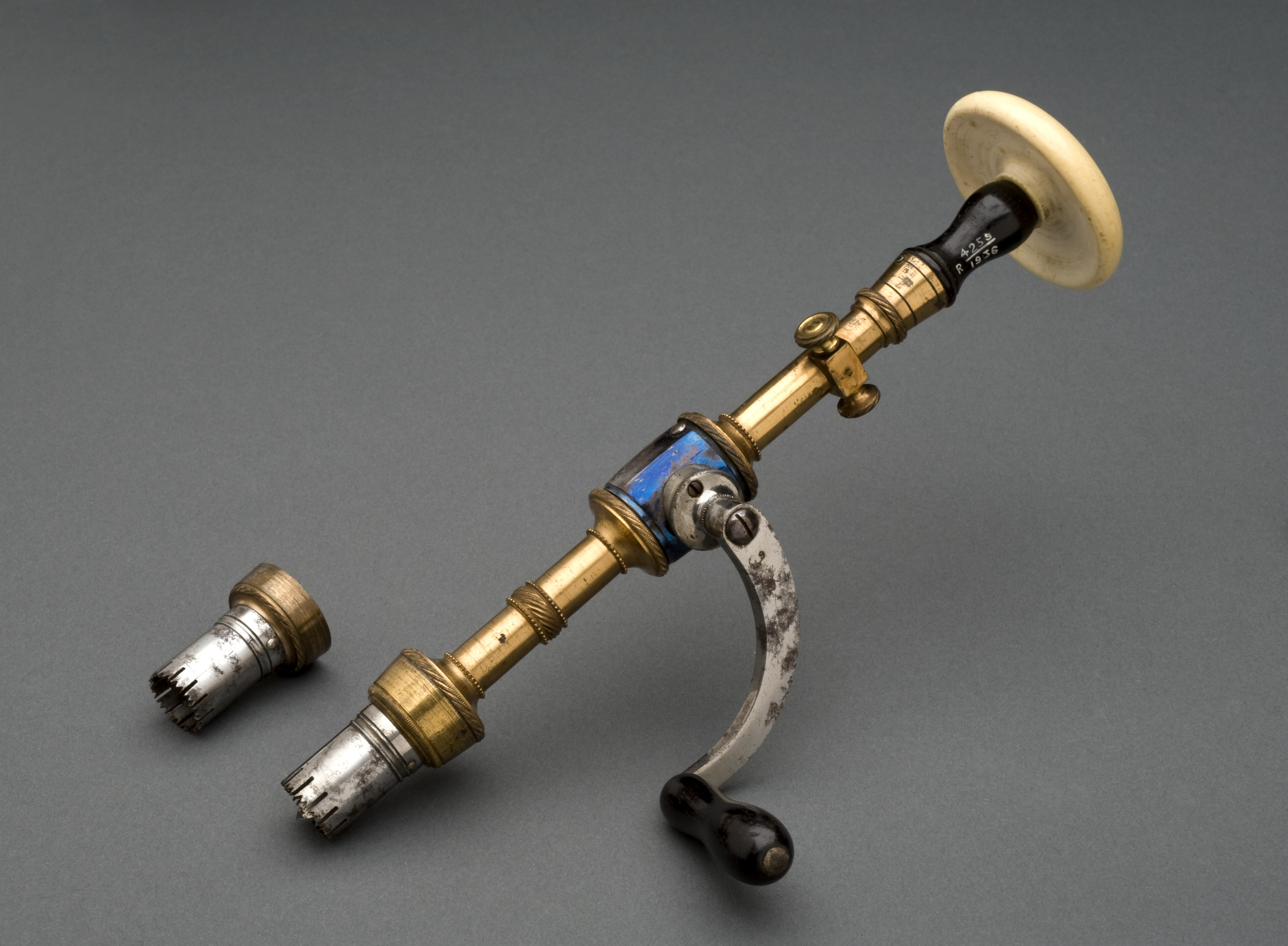
Cranial trephine with two bits, Europe, 1601–1800

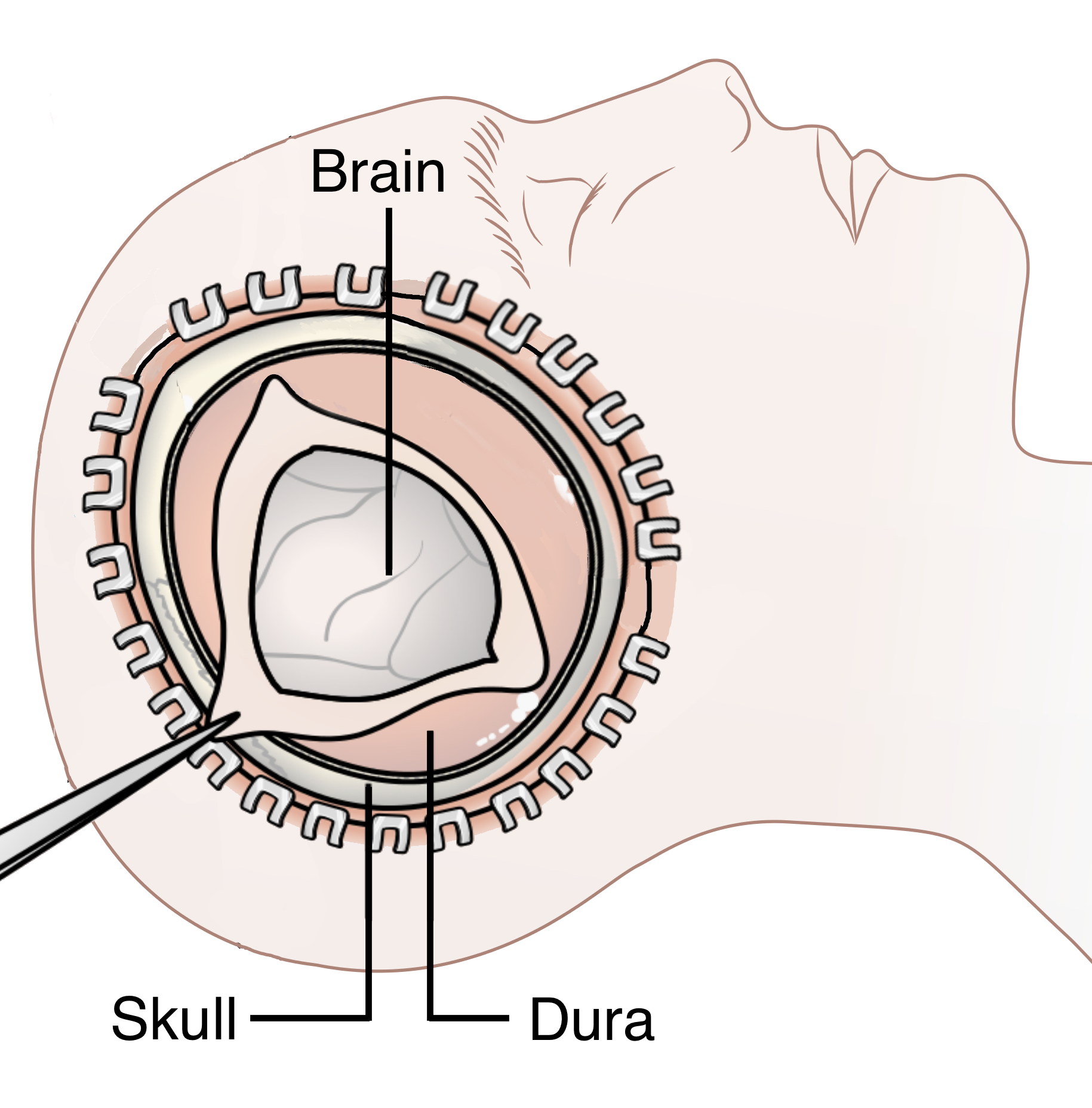
Decompressive Craniectomy

== See also ==
- Deep brain stimulation
- Instruments used in general surgery
- Intracranial pressure
- Retractor (medical)
- Surgical scissors
