= RNF213 =

Protein-coding gene in the species Homo sapiens

Identifiers
- Aliases: RNF213, ALO17, C17orf27, KIAA1618, MYMY2, MYSTR, NET57, ring finger protein 213
- External IDs: OMIM: 613768; MGI: 1289196; GeneCards: RNF213
Enzyme activity
EC #	BRENDA	ExPASy	KEGG	MetaCyc
2.3.2.27	↗	↗	↗	↗

Gene location (Human)
Chr.	Chromosome 17 (human)
Band	17q25.3	Start	80,260,852 bp
Band	17q25.3	End	80,398,794 bp

Gene location (Mouse)
Chr.	Chromosome 11 (mouse)
Band	11 E2|11 83.48 cM	Start	119,283,926 bp
Band	11 E2|11 83.48 cM	End	119,378,244 bp
RNA expression pattern
Bgee	Human / Mouse (ortholog); Top expressed in: granulocyte; pancreatic ductal cell; spleen; sural nerve; bone marrow cell; upper lobe of left lung; monocyte; right lobe of thyroid gland; right uterine tube; gastric mucosa / Top expressed in: cervix; lymph node; epithelium of small intestine; stroma of bone marrow; mesenteric lymph nodes; ovary; otolith organ; utricle; interventricular septum; submandibular gland; More reference expression data
BioGPS	n/a
Gene ontology
Molecular function	protein binding; metal ion binding; hydrolase activity; ATPase activity; ubiquitin-protein transferase activity; transferase activity
Cellular component	nucleolus; membrane; cytoplasm; cytosol
Biological process	ubiquitin-dependent protein catabolic process; negative regulation of non-canonical Wnt signaling pathway; angiogenesis; sprouting angiogenesis; protein homooligomerization; protein autoubiquitination; protein ubiquitination; protein polyubiquitination
Sources:Amigo / QuickGO
Orthologs
Databases	NCBI: entry; OMA: entry
Species	Human	Mouse
Entrez	57674	672511
Ensembl	ENSG00000173821	ENSMUSG00000070327
UniProt	Q63HN8	n/a
RefSeq (mRNA)	NM_001256071; NM_020914; NM_020954	NM_001040005
RefSeq (protein)	NP_001243000; NP_066005	n/a
Location (UCSC)	Chr 17: 80.26 – 80.4 Mb	Chr 11: 119.28 – 119.38 Mb
PubMed search
- Wikidata
View/Edit Human	View/Edit Mouse

Ring finger protein 213 is a protein that in humans is encoded by the RNF213 gene. RNF213 is a 591kDa cytosolic E3 ubiquitin ligase with RING finger and AAA+ ATPase domains.

== Clinical relevance ==
Chromosome-wide linkage analysis found that moyamoya disease locus resides in chromosome 17q25. Genome-wide linkage analysis of 15 Japanese families of autosomal dominant moyamoya disease narrowed down the locus to 17q25.3. Direct sequencing of the region and whole-exome sequencing identified the p.Arg4810Lys mutation in RNF213 gene as a founder mutation of moyamoya disease. A genome-wide association study also identified RNF213 as a disease causing gene for Moyamoya disease. Comparative evolutionary genome sequencing analyses in humans and monkeys showed that the strongest evidence for acceleration along the branch leading to hominines was RNF213. RNF213 has been shown to be associated with blood flow and oxygen consumption. Given that oxygen and glucose consumption scales with total neuron number, RNF213 may have played a role in facilitating the evolution of larger brains in primates.
