= Craniotomy =

Surgical operation on skull

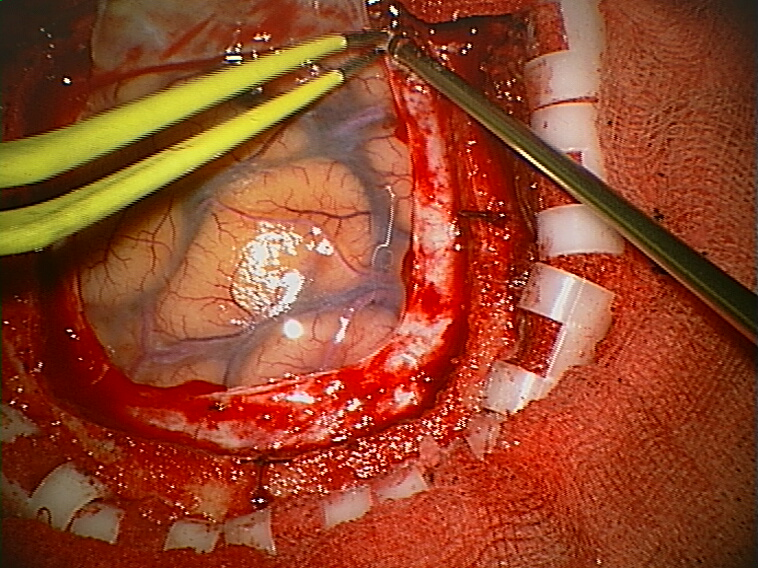
- ICD-9-CM: 01.2
- MeSH: D003399
- eMedicine: 1890449

A craniotomy is a type of brain surgery where surgeons temporarily remove a portion of the skull to access the brain. Surgeons often perform them to treat serious conditions like brain tumors, hemorrhages, and to remove foreign bodies such as bullets. A craniotomy is different from a craniectomy (in which the skull flap is not immediately replaced, allowing the brain to swell, thus reducing intracranial pressure) and from trepanation, the creation of a burr hole through the cranium into the dura mater.

== Indications ==
A cramiotomy can be performed both to diagnose and treat problems. Its function is to provide surgeons with temporary access to the intracranial space.

- Neoplastic lesions: resection or biopsy of primary or metastatic brain tumors.
- Trauma: elevation of depressed skull fractures; extraction of penetrating intracranial foreign bodies.
- Intracranial hemorrhage: evacuation of epidural, subdural, or intracerebral hematomas.
- Infection: drainage and washout of abscesses or empyemas.
- Vascular lesions: clipping of intracranial aneurysms; treatment of arteriovenous malformations or fistulas; microvascular decompression for trigeminal neuralgia or hemifacial spasm.
- Open revascularization procedures: extracranial–intracranial bypass; encephaloduroarteriosynangiosis (EDAS).
- Epilepsy and functional neurosurgery: cortical resection; lesionectomy; implantation of deep brain stimulation electrodes.
- Cerebrospinal fluid–related procedures: repair of CSF leaks; creation of CSF shunts; endoscopic third ventriculostomy (ETV); fenestration of arachnoid cysts.
- Skull base or cranial nerve decompression: resection of skull base tumors such as vestibular schwannoma or meningioma; decompression of cranial nerves.

== Procedure ==
Diagram of the elements of a craniotomy.

Most craniotomies are performed under general anesthesia, although in some cases, patients remain awake with local anesthesia. With proper anesthesia and pain medication, the procedure does not typically cause much or any discomfort. Before the surgery, doctors generally use an MRI or CT scan to map out the exact places where to operate. Surgeons need to usually remove bone and determine the right angle of access.

How much of the skull is removed depends on the specific procedure. After incision of the skin and dissection of the tissues of the scalp, the bone flap is removed with a cranial drill. At the conclusion of the procedure, the bone flap is replaced using titanium plates and screws or another form of fixation. In the event the host bone does not accept its replacement, an artificial piece of skull, often made of PEEK, is substituted. The PEEK flap is typically modeled by a CNC machine capable of accepting a high resolution MRI computer file in order to provide a close fit, in an effort to minimize fitment issues, and therefore minimizing the duration of the cranial surgery.

== Approaches ==
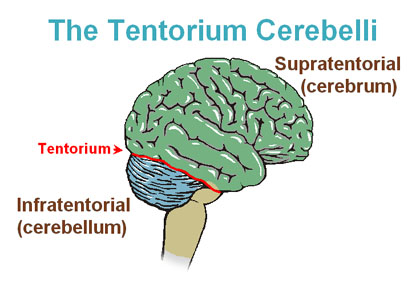
An illustration of the supratentorial and infratentorial regions of the brain.

Craniotomies are grouped by which part of the skull surgeons open to access the brain, also known as the intracranial space. Different anatomic approaches provide access to specific intracranial regions, and the selected approach depends on the location of the pathology and surrounding nerves and blood vessels. Each approach is defined by characteristic anatomic landmarks. Though not all craniotomies utilize an established approach, most follow standardized openings that offer consistent and reliable surgical exposure. More than one approach may be appropriate for a given pathology, and the choice may vary across surgeons and institutions.

=== Supratentorial approaches ===
- Frontal: Unilateral approach to the frontal lobe and frontal convexity, used for frontal lobe tumors, abscesses, or other localized frontal lesions.
- Bifrontal: Wide bilateral approach to the anterior cranial fossa and midline skull base, often used for resection of large or midline tumors.
- Temporal: Approach to the temporal lobe and middle cranial fossa, which can be used for temporal lobe tumors, mesial temporal lobe epilepsy surgery, or other middle fossa pathology.
- Pterional: Approach to the Sylvian fissure and parasellar region, often used for anterior circulation aneurysms, skull base tumors, or sphenoid wing lesions.
- Parietal: Approach to the parietal convexity or perirolandic region, used for parietal lobe tumors, vascular malformations, interhemispheric lesions, or lesions near the sensorimotor cortex.

=== Infratentorial approaches ===
- Retrosigmoid: Approach to the cerebellopontine angle and lateral posterior fossa, used for resection of vestibular schwannomas or microvascular decompression.
- Suboccipital: Approach to the midline posterior fossa, often used for cerebellar tumors, Chiari malformation decompression, or brainstem lesions.

== Complications ==
Complications can occur during or after a craniotomy. How often they happen, and how serious they are, depends on the patient, the kind of surgery, how it's performed, and the condition being treated.

=== Meningitis and infection ===
Meningitis occurs in about 0.8 to 1.5% of individuals undergoing craniotomy. Perioperative antibiotic prophylaxis may be used to prevent meningitis in craniotomy patients.

According to the Journal of Neurosurgery, clinical studies indicated that "the risk for meningitis was independently associated with perioperative steroid use and ventricular drainage". In a series of 334 procedures, their results showed that traumatic brain injuries were the predominant cause of bacterial meningitis. Nearly 40% of patients developed one or more infections.

Cerebrospinal fluid shunt (CSF) associates with the risk of meningitis due to the following factors: pre-shunt associated infections, post-operative CSF leakage, lack of experience from the neurosurgeon, premature birth/young age, advanced age, shunt revisions for dysfunction, and neuroendoscopes. The way shunts are operated on each patient relies heavily on the cleanliness of the site. Once bacteria penetrates the area of a CSF, the procedure becomes more complicated.

The skin is especially necessary to address because it is an external organ. Scratching the incision site can easily create an infection due to there being no barrier between the open air and wound. Aside from scratching, decubitus ulcer and tissues near the shunt site are also leading pathways for infection susceptibility.

=== Hemorrhage ===
A hemorrhage following a craniotomy can result from a failure to achieve hemostasis during surgery or from damage to blood vessels. Systematic reviews show that the incidence of clinically significant hematomas requiring surgical evacuation is low (around 1–2%) but varies depending on definitions and patient populations.

=== Neurologic deficit ===
Neurologic deficits can occur after craniotomy due to damage to eloquent regions of the brain or cranial nerves. A 2025 meta-analysis by Conway et al. combined data from 67 studies of glioma resections (2,616 patients) and found that approximately 32% of patients developed new motor deficits. About 14% developed permanent deficits and 18% developed transient deficits. The risk of neurologic deficit varies by anatomic location of craniotomy and the nature of the surgery being performed.

=== Cerebrospinal fluid leak ===
Cerebrospinal fluid leak can occur after craniotomy due to failure to create a watertight closure during dural closure or duraplasty. Systematic reviews report postoperative CSF leak rates around 1–10% in cranial surgeries.

=== Seizure ===
Seizure can occur intra- or post-operatively due to irritation of the cerebral cortex, which may cause abnormal electrical firing. Intra-operatively, seizure may be controlled by titrating the dosage of anesthetic agents or by administering antiepileptic drugs. It is also common to give patients anti-seizure medications for seven days post-operatively to prevent seizure. Traditionally this has been phenytoin, but now is increasingly levetiracetam as it has a lower risk of drug-drug interactions.

=== Post-operative pain ===
Post-craniotomy pain is common and moderate to severe in nature. This pain can be controlled through the use of scalp infiltrations, nerve scalp blocks, parecoxib, and morphine, which is usually the most effective drug in providing analgesia.

== See also ==
- Neurosurgery
- Decompressive craniectomy
- Trepanning
- Skull
