= Van Meegeren =

Van Meegeren is a Dutch toponymic surname in which Meegeren refers to Nijmegen. Notable persons with that name include:

- Boebi van Meegeren (1924–2017), Dutch tennis player
- Han van Meegeren (1889–1947), Dutch painter and art-forger
- Jacques van Meegeren (1912–1977), Dutch illustrator and painter, son of Han van Meegeren

== See also ==
- Job Janszoon van Meekeren (1611–1666), Dutch surgeon
