= William Wayne Babcock =

American physician and scientist

- Born: June 10, 1872; East Worcester, New York, U.S.
- Died: February 23, 1963 (aged 90)
- Occupations: Physician, scientist

William Wayne Babcock (born June 10, 1872, in East Worcester, New York; † February 23, 1963) was an American physician and scientist. He developed a method of vein stripping to treat varicose veins.

== Life ==
Babcock was born on June 10, 1872, in East Worcester, New York and received his medical degree in Baltimore. He received his doctorate in 1893 at the age of 21. He then began training in surgery at St. Mark's Hospital in Salt Lake City, but soon moved to Philadelphia, where he worked in various institutes. In 1903 he became chair of surgery and the head of the Women's Clinic and the Surgical Clinic at Temple University. He held this position until his retirement in 1943. During his medical career, Babcock published more than 350 scientific publications. Babcock was married and had three daughters. He died at the age of 90 on February 23, 1963.

=== Babcock Operation ===
Among other things, Babcock developed a surgical procedure for the surgical removal of the saphenous veins of the legs in cases of varicose veins. This operation was carried out using a probe that is inserted into the vein at the ankle, passed through to the groin and then pulled out of the leg again, with the glans-shaped probe taking the vein along with it. Babcock's method represented an alternative to the surgical procedures common at the time, in which the entire length of the leg was opened. Almost at the same time as Babcock, a method was developed at the Johanniter Hospital in Stendal, Germany that was described by Gotthold Friedel in 1908, in which a circular incision over one and a half meters long was intended to destroy the varix. This became an established practice of the time. In German-speaking countries, the chief physician of the Hamburg Harbor Hospital, Karl Lauenstein, first introduced Babcock's method at the surgeons' congress in Berlin in 1911. The Babcock operation was slow to gain acceptance and was only included in surgical textbooks around 1930.

=== The Babcock-Bacon Operation ===
Developed in collaboration with Dr. Charles M. Bacon, this procedure aimed to treat rectal and sigmoid colon cancer while preserving the anal sphincters. Prior to this technique, radical surgery often resulted in permanent colostomies, significantly impacting patients' quality of life. The Babcock-Bacon operation involved a meticulous dissection and mobilization of the rectum and colon, allowing for resection of the cancerous tissue while preserving the sphincter muscles and blood supply. This innovative approach improved both oncological outcomes and patient well-being, and remains a cornerstone of colorectal cancer surgery today.

=== The "Soup Bone" Cranioplasty Technique ===
This technique, named for its resemblance to the shape of a marrow-filled bone, addressed skull defects resulting from trauma or tumor removal. Babcock pioneered the use of autologous bone grafts, harvested from the patient's own ribs, to reconstruct the missing skull. The curved shape of the rib provided a natural contour for the cranial vault, offering both structural support and aesthetic improvement. The "soup bone" technique marked a significant advancement in cranioplasty, offering a safe and effective method for skull reconstruction with minimal donor site morbidity.

=== Nerve Disassociation Technique ===
Babcock recognized the role of nerve entrapment and inflammation in contributing to pain and paralysis. He developed a technique for dissecting and separating affected nerves from surrounding tissues, alleviating pressure and promoting nerve recovery. This "nerve disassociation" approach proved effective in treating various conditions, including carpal tunnel syndrome, tarsal tunnel syndrome, and meralgia paresthetica. Babcock's technique laid the foundation for modern nerve decompression surgeries, offering relief to patients suffering from chronic pain and sensory disturbances.

== Inventions ==
Babcock invented the Babcock forceps, the Babcock probe, the sump drain, and the lamp chimney sump drain.

== Honors and awards ==
Babcock received the American Medical Association Gold Honorary Meritorious Service Medal. In addition, the surgical clinic at Temple University was named after him after his retirement. As early as 1905, a group of students at Temple University inspired by Babcock had formed the Babcock Surgical Society. This society continues to exist today.
