= Decompressive craniectomy =

Neurosurgical procedure to treat swelling

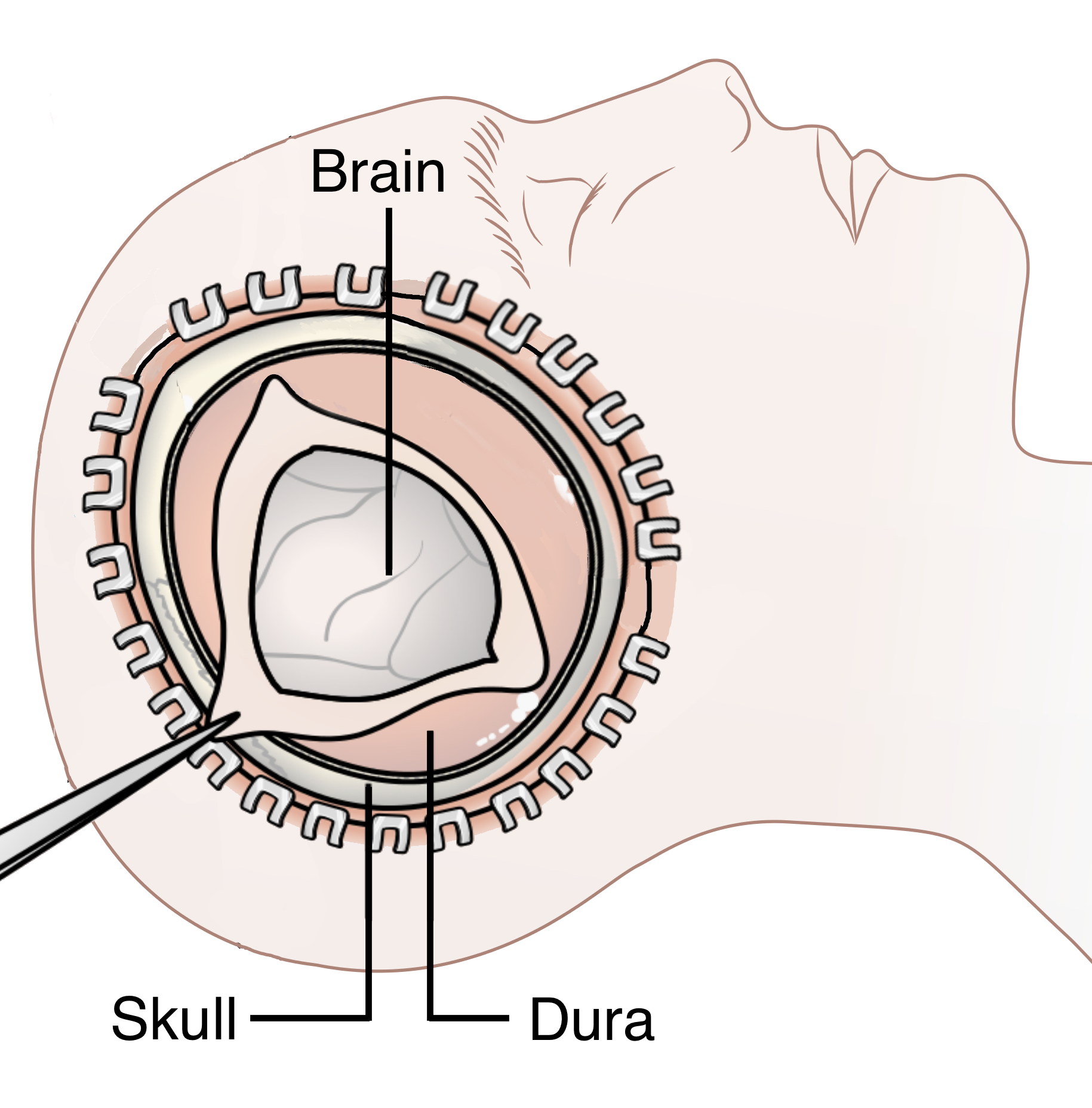
- Diagram showing the elements of a decompressive craniectomy
- ICD-9-CM: 01.2, 02.02
- MeSH: D056424

Decompressive craniectomy (crani- + -ectomy) is a neurosurgical procedure in which part of the skull is removed to allow a swelling or herniating brain room to expand without being squeezed. It is performed on victims of traumatic brain injury, stroke, Chiari malformation, and other conditions associated with raised intracranial pressure. Use of this surgery is controversial.

The procedure evolved from a primitive form of surgery known as trepanning. The older procedure, while common in prehistoric times, was deprecated in favor of other, less invasive treatments as they were developed; although it was still performed with some frequency prior to the twentieth century, its resurgence in modern form became possible only upon the development of precision cutting tools, cranial drills, and sophisticated post-operative care such as antibiotics.

== Results of clinical trials ==
=== Reduction of intracranial pressure ===
Though the procedure is considered a last resort, some evidence suggests that it does improve outcomes by lowering intracranial pressure (ICP), the pressure within the skull. Raised intracranial pressure is very often debilitating or fatal because it causes compression of the brain and restricts cerebral blood flow. The aim of decompressive craniectomy is to reduce this pressure. The part of the skull that is removed is called a bone flap. A study has shown that the larger the removed bone flap is, the more ICP is reduced.

==== DECRA trial ====
In March 2011, investigators from Australia and several other countries published the results of the DECRA trial in The New England Journal of Medicine. This was a randomized trial comparing decompressive craniectomy to best medical therapy run between 2002 and 2010 to assess the optimal management of patients with medically refractory ICP following diffuse non-penetrating head injury. The study investigators found that decompressive craniectomy was associated with worse functional outcomes, as measured by a standard metric, than best medical care. There were no differences in deaths between groups. However, the results of the DECRA trial have been rejected or at least questioned by many practicing neurosurgeons, and a concurrently published editorial raises several study weaknesses. First, the threshold for defining increased ICP, and the time allowed before declaring ICP medically refractory, are not what many practicing physicians would consider increased or refractory. Second, out of almost 3500 potentially eligible patients, only 155 patients were enrolled, showing that the study cannot be generalized to all patients with severe non-penetrating brain injury. Lastly, more subjects in the craniectomy group had unreactive pupils than patients in the medical therapy group after randomisation and before surgical intervention; thus making this a possible confounding factor.

=== Other effects ===
In addition to reducing ICP, studies have found decompressive craniectomy to improve cerebral perfusion pressure and cerebral blood flow in head injured patients.

Decompressive craniectomy is also used to manage major strokes, associated with "malignant" edema and intracranial hypertension. The pooled evidence from three randomised controlled trials in Europe supports the retrospective observations that early (within 48 hours) application of decompressive craniectomy after "malignant" stroke may result in improved survival and functional outcome in patients under the age of 55, compared to conservative management alone.

The procedure is recommended especially for young patients in whom ICP is not controllable by other methods. Age of greater than 50 years is associated with a poorer outcome after the surgery.

=== Complications ===
Infections such as meningitis or brain abscess can occur after decompressive craniectomy.

=== Children ===
In severely head injured children, a study has shown that decompressive craniectomy resulted in good recovery in all children in the study, suggesting the procedure has an advantage over non-surgical treatment in children. In one of the largest studies on pediatric patients, Jagannathan et al. found a net 65% favorable outcomes rate in pediatric patients for accidental trauma after craniectomy when followed for more than five years. Only three patients were dependent on caregivers. This is the only prospective randomly controlled study to date to support the potential benefit of decompressive craniectomy following traumatic brain injury.

== Follow-up treatment ==
After a craniectomy, the risk of brain injury is increased, particularly after the patient heals and becomes mobile again. Therefore, special measures must be taken to protect the brain, such as a helmet or a temporary implant in the skull.

When the patient has healed sufficiently, the opening in the skull is usually closed with a cranioplasty. If possible, the original skull fragment is preserved after the craniectomy in anticipation of the cranioplasty.

== Ongoing trials ==
The RESCUEicp study is an international multicenter trial that finished recruitment in March 2014. The aim of this study is to determine the effectiveness of decompressive craniectomy, compared to medical management alone, to treat brain swelling and improve outcome. This study is coordinated by the University of Cambridge Academic Neurosurgery Unit and the European Brain Injury Consortium (EBIC).

The RESCUE-ASDH study is a multicenter, pragmatic, parallel group randomised trial that aims to compare the clinical and cost-effectiveness of decompressive craniectomy versus craniotomy for the management of adult head-injured patients undergoing evacuation of an acute subdural haematoma (ASDH). The trial has started recruiting, and is expected to run until 2020. This study is coordinated by the University of Cambridge Academic Neurosurgery Unit.
