= Job Janszoon van Meekeren =

Dutch surgeon

Job van Meekeren (1611 – 6 December 1666, in Amsterdam) was a Dutch surgeon.

Van Meekeren was a pupil of Nicolaas Tulp and became a surgeon in Amsterdam in 1635. He was respected by outstanding contemporary medical doctors for his knowledge of medical literature and his skills, who made a definite link between anatomy and surgery. He showed a great interest in hand surgery, and interesting is a demonstration of flexor tendon repairs on corpses by one of his pupils. He wrote a book, which gives a good representation of the state of the art of surgery in the seventeenth century in Amsterdam. Names and addresses of patients are fully mentioned, so even today it is known exactly where they lived and where the events took place. On the other hand, it is also known quite well what the surgeons and doctors looked like through the efforts of many excellent painters who depicted anatomy lessons. In Amsterdam, barber-surgeons' guilds were very eager to sit for group paintings, centered on the teaching medical doctor. The painter Aert Pietersz in 1603 painted Dr. Sebastiaan Egberts surrounded by 29 surgeons, and in 1619, Dr. Egberts was painted once more, this time with five learning surgeons, by Thomas de Keyser. Nicolaes Eliasz, named Pickenoy, painted Dr. Johan Fonteyn in 1625, and Rembrandt is well known for the Anatomy Lesson of Dr. Tulp (1632) and Dr. Deyman (1656). It is peculiar that a portrait of van Meekeren could not be traced.
