= List of fetal abnormalities =

Fetal abnormalities are conditions that affect a fetus or embryo, are able to be diagnosed prenatally, and may be fatal or cause disease after birth. They may include aneuploidies, structural abnormalities, or neoplasms.

- Acardiac twin
- Achondrogenesis
- Achondroplasia
- Adrenal hematoma
- Agenesis of the corpus callosum
- Amniotic band syndrome
- Anal atresia
- Anencephaly
- Angelman syndrome
- Aqueductal stenosis
- Arachnoid cyst
- Arthrogryposis
- Bilateral multicystic dysplastic kidneys
- Camptomelic dysplasia
- Cardiac rhabdomyoma
- Caudal regression syndrome
- Chorioangioma
- Cleft palate
- Club foot
- Coarctation of the aorta
- Conjoined twins
- Cyclopia
- Cystic hygroma
- Dandy–Walker malformation
- Diaphragmatic hernia
- Diastrophic dysplasia
- Double outlet right ventricle
- Duodenal atresia
- Ebstein's anomaly
- Ectopia cordis
- Encephalocele
- Endocardial cushion defect
- Esophageal atresia
- Exstrophy of the bladder
- Fetal alcohol syndrome
- First arch syndrome
- Focal femoral hypoplasia
- Gastrointestinal atresia
- Gastroschisis
- Holoprosencephaly
- Hydranencephaly
- Hydronephrosis
- Hydrops fetalis
- Hypoplastic left heart syndrome
- Infantile polycystic kidney disease
- Iniencephaly
- Intracranial teratoma
- Intrauterine growth retardation
- Klippel–Trénaunay syndrome
- Limb body wall complex
- Macrosomia
- Meconium cyst
- Meconium ileus
- Microcephaly
- Multicystic dysplastic kidney
- Multiple pterygium syndrome
- Oligohydramnios
- Omphalocele
- Osteogenesis imperfecta
- Pentalogy of Cantrell
- Polydactyly
- Polyhydramnios
- Posterior urethral valves
- Renal agenesis
- Rh incompatibility
- Sacrococcygeal teratoma
- Spina bifida
- Spinal dysraphism
- Syndactyly
- Tetralogy of Fallot
- Thanatophoric dwarfism
- Transposition of the great vessels
- Triploidy
- Trisomy 13
- Trisomy 18
- Trisomy 21 (Down Syndrome)
- Turner syndrome (Monosomy X)
- Twin-to-twin transfusion syndrome
- Ureterocele
- VACTERL association
- Vein of Galen malformation
- Ventricular septal defect
