= Hydrocephalus =

Abnormal increase in cerebrospinal fluid in the ventricles of the brain

- Other names: Water on the brain
- Hydrocephalus as seen on a CT scan of the brain. The black areas in the middle of the brain (the lateral ventricles) are abnormally large and filled with fluid.
- Pronunciation: /ˌhaɪdroʊˈsɛfələs/
- Specialty: Neurosurgery
- Symptoms: Babies: rapid head growth, vomiting, sleepiness, seizures Older people: Headaches, double vision, poor balance, urinary incontinence, personality changes, mental impairment
- Causes: Neural tube defects, meningitis, brain tumors, traumatic brain injury, brain bleed during birth, intraventricular hemorrhage
- Risk factors: Smoking
- Diagnostic method: Based on symptoms and medical imaging
- Treatment: Surgery
- Prognosis: Variable, often normal life
- Frequency: Varies throughout the world, from 1 per 256 live births to 1 per 9,000, depending on access to prenatal health care, prenatal tests, and abortion

Hydrocephalus is a condition in which cerebrospinal fluid (CSF) builds up within or around the brain, which can cause pressure to increase in the skull. Symptoms may vary according to age. Headaches and double vision are common. Elderly adults with normal pressure hydrocephalus (NPH) may have poor balance, difficulty controlling urination or mental impairment. In babies, there may be a rapid increase in head size. Other symptoms may include vomiting, sleepiness, seizures, and downward pointing of the eyes.

Hydrocephalus can occur due to birth defects (primary) or can develop later in life (secondary). Hydrocephalus can be classified via mechanism into communicating, noncommunicating, ex vacuo, and normal pressure hydrocephalus. Diagnosis is made by physical examination and medical imaging, such as a CT scan.

Hydrocephalus is typically treated through surgery. One option is the placement of a shunt system. A procedure called an endoscopic third ventriculostomy has gained popularity in recent decades, and is an option in certain populations. Outcomes are variable, but many people with shunts live normal lives. However, there are many potential complications, including infection or breakage. There is a high risk of shunt failure in children especially. However, without treatment, permanent disability or death may occur.

Hydrocephalus affects about 0.1–0.6% of newborns. Rates in the developing world may be higher. Normal pressure hydrocephalus may affect up to 6% of people over 80. Description of hydrocephalus by Hippocrates dates back more than 2,000 years. The word hydrocephalus is from the Greek ὕδωρ, hydōr, meaning 'water' and κεφαλή, kephalē, meaning 'head'.

== Signs and symptoms ==
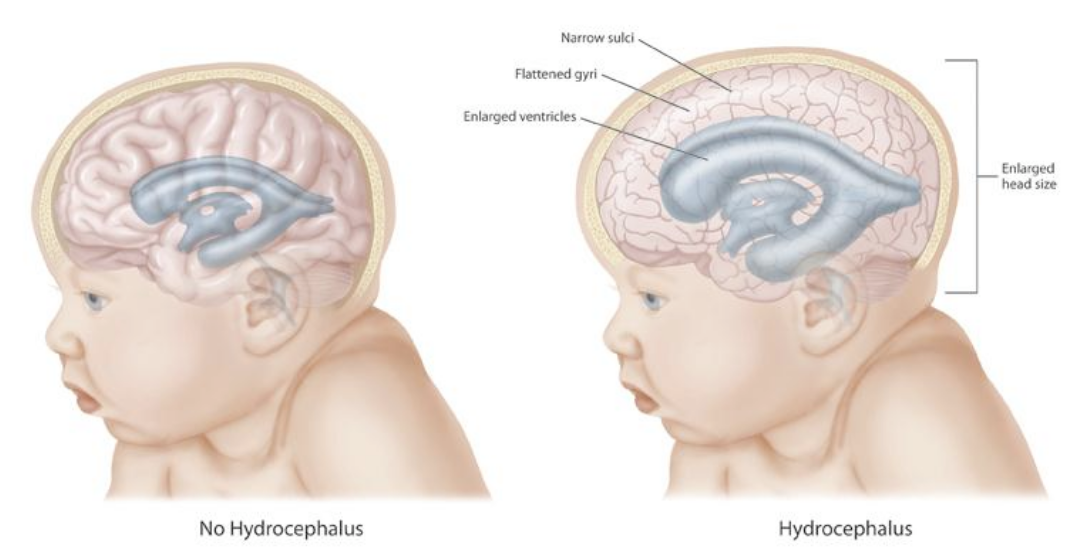
Illustration showing different effects of hydrocephalus on the brain and cranium

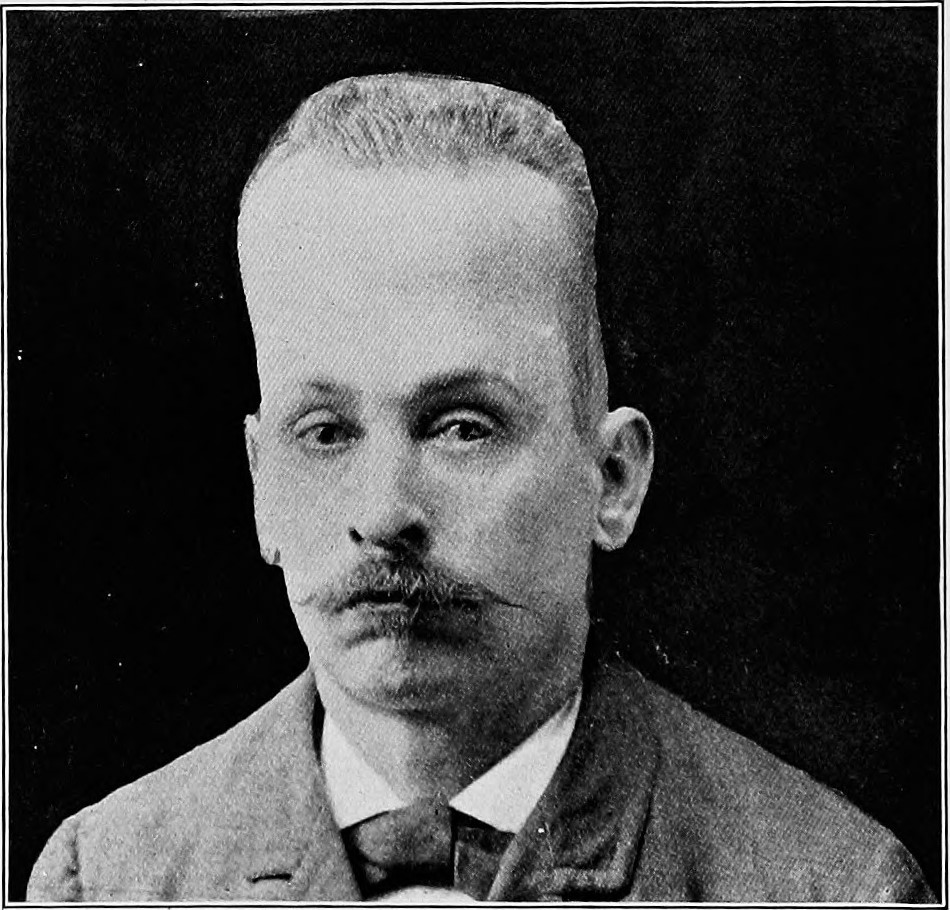
Adult showing cranial deformity from pediatric hydrocephalus

=== Infants ===
Hydrocephalus is difficult to detect clinically before birth, although enlarged ventricles can be spotted on ultrasonography as early as 18–20 weeks gestation. Since infants' skulls are not fully fused together at the cranial sutures yet, they have soft spots on their skulls known as open fontanelles. This anatomic characteristic means that infants' skulls can visibly grow in size when cerebrospinal fluid accumulates. Therefore, infants with hydrocephalus may present with an enlarged skull (or rapid growth in skull size), bulging fontanelles, or separated cranial sutures. Parents or physicians may also note that the infant is more irritable or tired than normal. Other symptoms include seizures, inability to look upwards ("sunset eyes" or "setting sun" sign), and pauses in breathing. Infants may also present with lack of weight gain or failure to meet motor and developmental milestones. Imaging can be done to confirm the suspected diagnosis of hydrocephalus. In infants, the open fontanelles allow for use of head ultrasonography. This allows pediatricians to minimize radiation exposure and come up with a diagnosis quickly. If further information is needed, an MRI can be done.

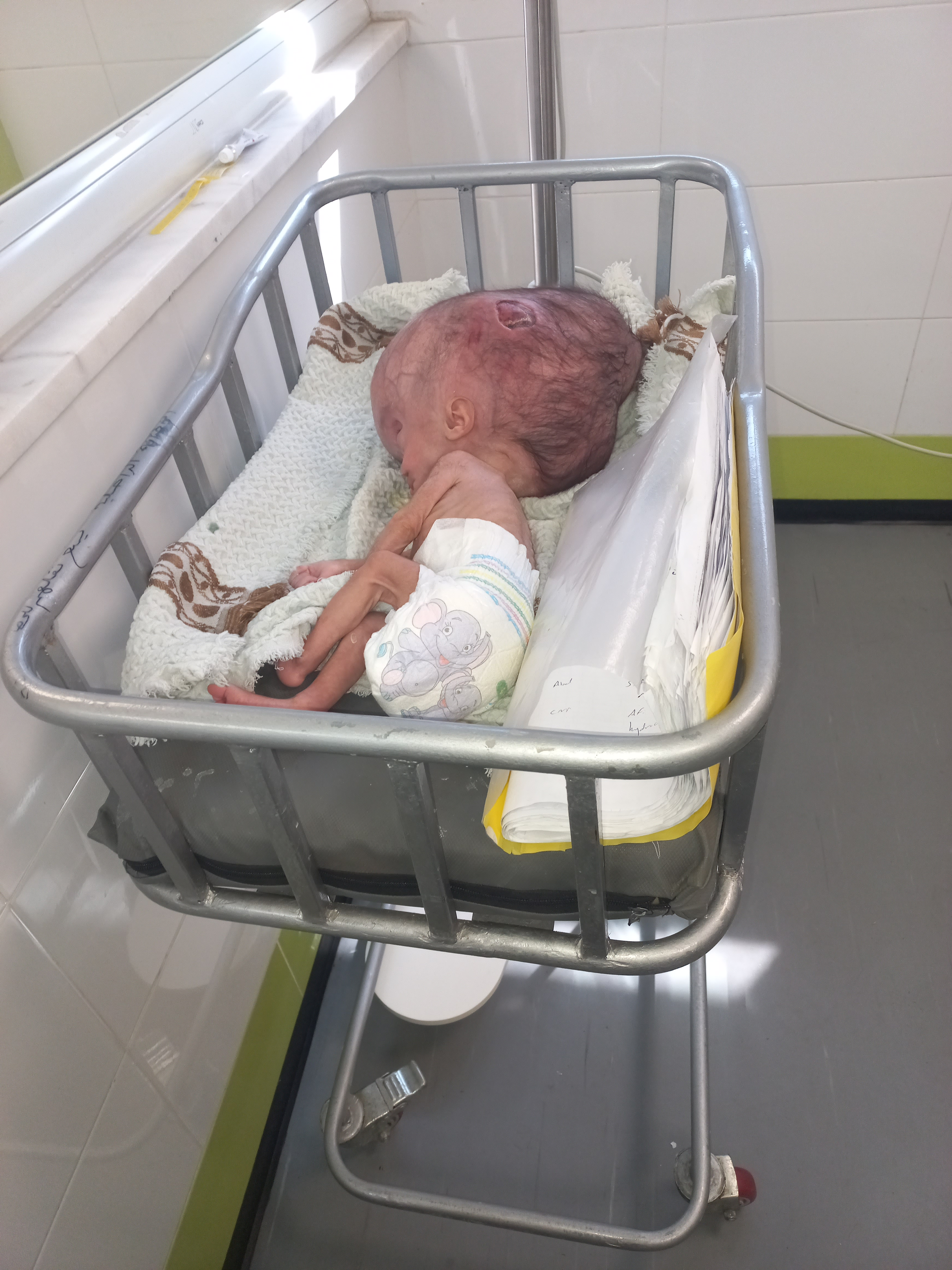
The photo depicts a severe case of hydrocephalus, showing an abnormally enlarged skull due to excess cerebrospinal fluid in the brain's ventricles. The head is significantly enlarged, with visible veins, stretched skin, and potential sunken eyes.

When hydrocephalus occurs as part of a syndrome, infants tend to present with other characteristic symptoms. For example, those affected by the Walker-Warburg syndrome may also have holoprosencephaly and several other cranial defects. Hydrocephalus may also be present in Gorlin syndrome, mucopolysaccharidoses, Peters-plus syndrome, primary ciliary dyskinesia, Rothmund-Thomson syndrome, and Sotos syndrome. The VACTERL disorders (vertebral anomalies, anal atresia, cardiac defects, tracheoesophageal fistula, renal and radial anomalies, and limb defects) may also include hydrocephalus (VACTERL-H). Hydrocephalus can also occur as part of neurocutaneous disorders such as neurofibromatosis type I (NF I) and tuberous sclerosis. It has also been recorded among infants affected by triploidy and by trisomy disorders such as Down, Patau and Edwards syndromes, as well as trisomies 9 and 19p.

=== Children ===
In older children, the fontanelles are closed, so there is no visible change in head size. Since there is limited expansion of the skull, symptoms are more representative of the effects of increased intracranial pressure (ICP) on a child's developing brain. The most common presenting features in this age group are memory and concentration issues as well as motor and gait abnormalities. Nausea, vomiting, and a tremor of the arms and legs are also common features in older children. Patients may also have papilledema (swelling of the optic disc), worsening vision, and difficulty looking upwards on examination. A key feature in this age group includes headaches, due to the intracranial hypertension caused by the increased CSF in the closed space of the skull. These headaches tend to occur early in the morning as patients have been in a horizontal position throughout the night, which increases ICP.

Symptoms that may occur in older children can include:

- Brief, shrill, high-pitched cry
- Changes in personality, memory, or the ability to reason or think
- Changes in facial appearance and eye spacing (craniofacial disproportion)
- Crossed eyes or uncontrolled eye movements
- Difficulty feeding
- Excessive sleepiness
- Headaches
- Irritability, poor temper control
- Loss of bladder control (urinary incontinence)
- Loss of coordination and trouble walking
- Muscle spasticity (spasm)
- Slow growth (child 0–5 years)
- Delayed milestones
- Failure to thrive
- Slow or restricted movement
- Vomiting

Since increased ICP can damage the brain, thought and behavior may be negatively affected. Learning disabilities, including short-term memory loss, are common among those with hydrocephalus. Affected children tend to score better on verbal IQ than on performance IQ, a pattern which is thought to reflect the distribution of nerve damage to the brain. Hydrocephalus that is present from a young age can cause long-term problems with speech and language. Children can have trouble understanding complex and abstract concepts or difficulty retrieving stored information. They may also have a nonverbal learning disorder or spatial/perceptual disorders. Children affected by hydrocephalus may also have difficulty in understanding concepts within conversation. This is thought to be due to an inability to understand or interpret context. These children may tend to use words they know or have heard. However, the severity of hydrocephalus can differ considerably between individuals, and some are of average or above-average intelligence. Aside from learning disabilities, a child with hydrocephalus may also have coordination and visual problems. They may reach puberty earlier than the average child (this is called precocious puberty). About one in four develops epilepsy.

=== Adults ===
In adults, acute hydrocephalus can have many of the same signs and symptoms (headaches, vomiting, nausea, papilledema, sleepiness, or coma) of increased ICP that are seen in children. Increased volumes of CSF can also result in hearing loss, including sensorineural hearing loss (SNHL). Hearing loss is a rare but well-known sequela of procedures resulting in CSF loss. Elevated ICP can also cause a portion of the brain to move out of place (uncal or tonsillar herniation), which can result in brain stem compression and possible death.

By contrast, chronic dilatation (especially in the elderly population) may present in a more insidious manner. Hakim's triad of gait instability, urinary incontinence, and dementia is a relatively typical manifestation of a form of hydrocephalus known as normal pressure hydrocephalus (NPH). Focal neurological deficits may also occur, such as abducens nerve palsy and vertical gaze palsy (Parinaud syndrome due to compression of the quadrigeminal plate, where the neural centers coordinating the conjugated vertical eye movement are located). The symptoms depend on the cause of the blockage, the person's age, and how much brain tissue has been damaged by the swelling.

Hydrocephalus ex vacuo is a condition in which there is ventriculomegaly due to loss of brain volume which then results in a subsequent increase in CSF. This is most commonly seen in patients with neurodegenerative disorders such as Alzheimer's disease (due to hippocampal atrophy specifically). Therefore, the presenting symptoms of this condition will likely be those of Alzheimer's: memory loss, loss of language skills or comprehension (aphasia), inability to perform purposeful movements (apraxia), and inability to conduct activities of daily living independently. Hydrocephalus ex vacuo can also occur due to traumatic brain injuries or due to strokes.

== Causes ==
Hydrocephalus can be caused by a combination of factors and is not fully understood. Any medical condition that interrupts the flow of cerebrospinal fluid (CSF) can cause this build-up of excess fluid. This occurs due to blocked pathways of cerebrospinal fluid (CSF), issues with CSF reabsorption, or increased CSF production.

Hydrocephalus can be classified as primary or secondary (acquired) based on the cause.

=== Primary ===
Primary hydrocephalus involves congenital, developmental, and genetic factors that lead to excess CSF build-up. Up to 50% of the causes of primary hydrocephalus are genetic.

Congenital hydrocephalus is defined by the presence of excess CSF at birth. It occurs due to a combination of factors, especially genetic causes prior to birth (meaning the fetus may develop hydrocephalus in utero during fetal development). The genes involved in congenital hydrocephalus involve aqueduct defects, development of the central nervous system, and cilia (involved in the movement and flow of CSF). The most common cause of congenital hydrocephalus is aqueductal stenosis, which occurs when the narrow passage between the third and fourth ventricles in the brain is blocked or too narrow to allow sufficient cerebral spinal fluid to drain. Fluid accumulates in the upper ventricles, causing build up and hydrocephalus.

Developmental disorders including neural-tube defects, arachnoid cysts, Dandy–Walker malformations, and Arnold–Chiari malformations can cause primary hydrocephalus. Dandy-Walker malformations and Arnold-Chiari malformations lead to structural abnormalities in the brain, which disrupts the flow of CSF and causes hydrocephalus.

Neural tube defects are commonly caused by a deficiency of folic acid during pregnancy. Spina bifida is a neural tube defect that involves defects in the development of the spine, and it can cause hydrocephalus. Myelomeningocele is the most severe type of spina bifida, involving an open spinal column and the exact mechanism of hydrocephalus involved in this condition is unclear.

=== Secondary (Acquired) ===
Secondary hydrocephalus is acquired as a consequence of CNS infections, meningitis, brain tumors, head trauma, toxoplasmosis, or intracranial hemorrhage (subarachnoid or intraparenchymal).

Intraventricular hemorrhage, or bleeding within the ventricles of the brain, leads to hydrocephalus in 51–89% of patients. This is because the blood in the ventricles blocks the regular flow of CSF, leading to build-up of excess CSF

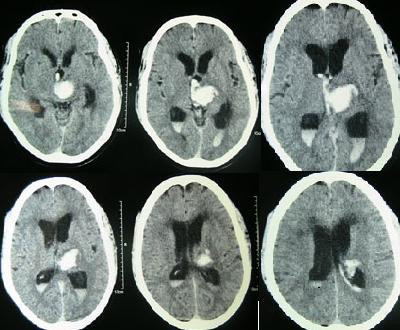
Spontaneous intracerebral and intraventricular hemorrhage with hydrocephalus shown on CT scan

Normal pressure hydrocephalus (NPH) most often occurs in elderly patients with symptoms including gait disturbance, urinary incontinence, and cognitive issues. It is commonly divided into two categories, idiopathic NPH (with unknown cause) and secondary NPH (due to trauma, hemorrhage, etc.).

Hydrocephalus can also be caused by overproduction of CSF (relative obstruction) such as choroid plexus papilloma, villous hypertrophy.

Brain atrophy or breakdown in elderly patients or patients with conditions like Parkinson's or Alzheimer's can lead to acquired hydrocephalus. This is likely because the breakdown of brain cells leads to ventriculomegaly (enlargement of ventricles) and increased space for CSF to fill.

== Mechanism ==
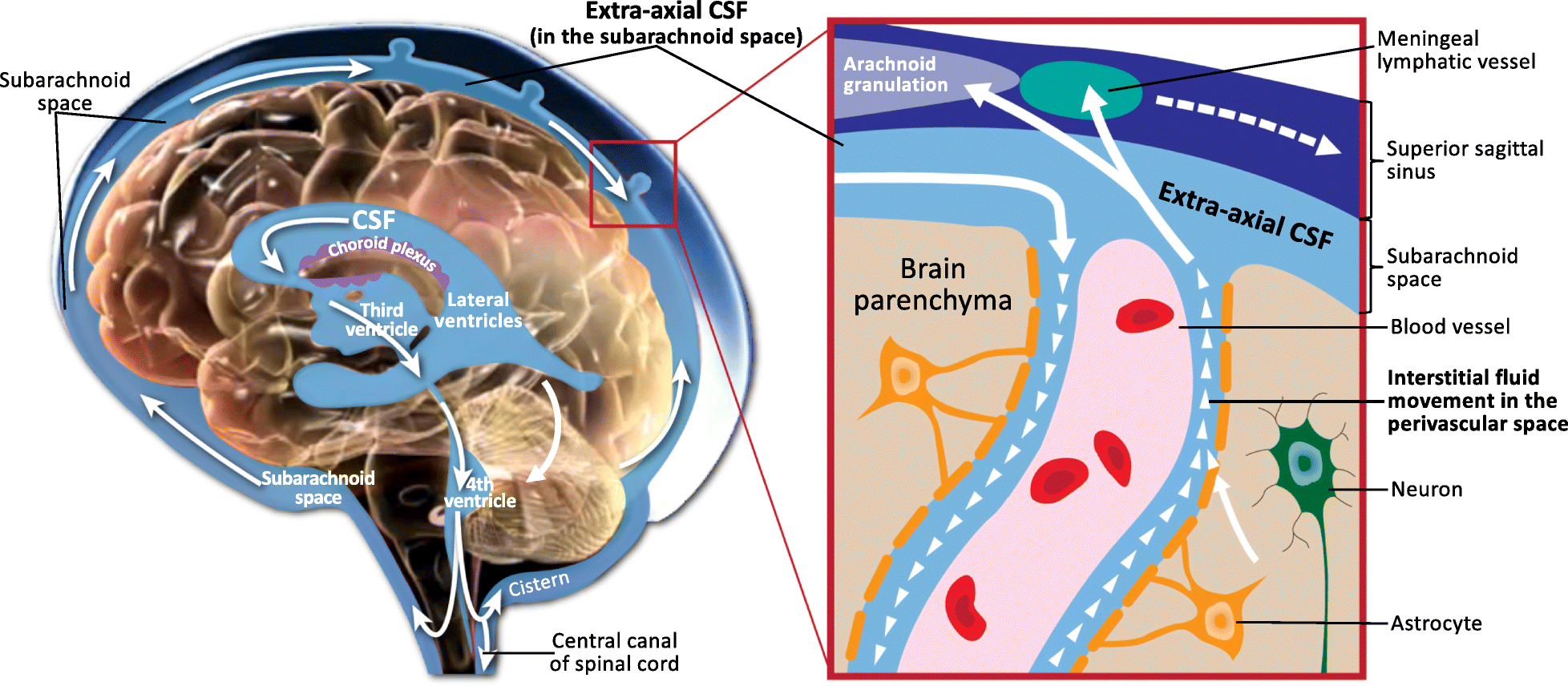
Diagram showing CSF flow and neuroanatomy.

Hydrocephalus is due to an imbalance between the amount of cerebrospinal fluid (CSF) produced and the amount reabsorbed (or removed from the ventricular system). The purpose of cerebrospinal fluid is to provide mechanical support, nutrients, and remove waste from the central nervous system. In a person without hydrocephalus, CSF continuously circulates through the brain, its ventricles and the spinal cord and is continuously drained away into the circulatory system. Alternatively, the condition may result from an overproduction of the CSF, from a congenital malformation blocking normal drainage of the fluid, or from complications of head injuries or infections.

The choroid plexus, located in the lateral ventricles, forms the majority of CSF (believed to be around 70–80%). The ependymal lining of the ventricular system, the subarachnoid space, and the blood-brain-barrier forms the rest.

CSF flows through the ventricular system through the following pathway:
Lateral Ventricles → Interventricular Foramen of Monro → Third Ventricle → Cerebral Aqueduct → Fourth Ventricle

The CSF then exits the fourth ventricle through the median aperture and lateral aperture. It goes into the subarachnoid space or central canal of the spinal cord. Then, it is absorbed by the vili of arachnoid granulations into the blood circulation.

There have also been recent theories and studies exploring the drainage of CSF. One theory involves the drainage of CSF into the lymphatic vessel system. The lymphatic vessel system clears proteins and fluid throughout the body, but whether they are involved in CSF drainage within the brain is controversial and not yet clear. Lymphatic vessels in the dura mater is a possible site of CSF drainage.

Cilia plays a role in the flow of CSF. Cilia are long microtubules on the cell membranes of many cells, including ependymal cells (which line the ventricular system). Some genetic causes of congenital hydrocephalus have been linked to issues with cilia.

=== Mechanism of symptoms ===
When the cerebrospinal fluid builds up, it causes compression of the brain, which leads to the symptoms of convulsions, intellectual disability, and epileptic seizures. These signs occur sooner in adults because their skulls are no longer able to expand to accommodate the increasing fluid volume. Fetuses, infants, and young children with hydrocephalus have head enlargement, excluding the face, because the pressure of the fluid causes the individual skull bones—which have yet to fuse—to bulge outward at their juncture points.

A rare complication of hydrocephalus is hearing loss. There are a few possible mechanisms involved in hearing loss in hydrocephalus. The cochlear aqueduct connects the perilymphatic space of the inner ear with the subarachnoid space of the posterior cranial fossa. Because of the delicate relationship between pressure and hearing, hearing loss may also be caused after a shunt is placed to treat hydrocephalus.

CSF can accumulate within the ventricles, a condition called internal hydrocephalus. It may result in increased CSF pressure. The production of CSF continues, even when the passages that normally allow it to exit the brain are blocked. Consequently, fluid builds inside the brain, causing pressure that dilates the ventricles and compresses the nervous tissue. Compression of the nervous tissue usually results in irreversible brain damage. If the skull bones are not completely ossified when the hydrocephalus occurs, the pressure may also severely enlarge the head. The cerebral aqueduct may be blocked at the time of birth or may become blocked later in life because of a tumor growing in the brainstem.

== Classification ==
The classification of communicating vs. noncommunicating hydrocephalus are often used to describe the types of hydrocephalus. These terms describe the nonobstructive vs. obstructive mechanisms of the excess CSF build-up.

=== Communicating ===
In communicating hydrocephalus, there is no obstruction of CSF flow. Instead, there is either an increased production of CSF or difficulty reabsorbing CSF. Reabsorption occurs at the arachnoid granulations, so issues with reabsorption can occur because of arachnoid granulation impairment. There is also evidence of the lymphatic system being involved with reabsorption, so impairments of this system can also lead to excess CSF. Damage to these reabsorption sites are commonly post-hemorrhage or post-infection (such as meningitis). Scarring and fibrosis of the subarachnoid space following infectious, inflammatory, or hemorrhagic events can also prevent reabsorption of CSF, causing hydrocephalus.

Normal pressure hydrocephalus (NPH) is a form of chronic communicating hydrocephalus, with enlarged cerebral ventricles and intermittently increased cerebrospinal fluid pressure. The symptoms include dementia, gait changes, and urinary incontinence. It is diagnosed with continuous intraventricular pressure recordings (over 24 hours or even longer) because instant measurements can show normal pressure values. Dynamic compliance studies may be also helpful. Altered compliance (elasticity) of the ventricular walls, as well as increased viscosity of the cerebrospinal fluid, may play a role in the pathogenesis.

=== Noncommunicating ===
In noncommunicating hydrocephalus, there is obstruction to the CSF flow. Examples of common causes include hemorrhage, tumor, traumatic brain injury that disrupt the flow, leading to build-up of CSF in the brain.

== Treatments ==
=== Procedures ===
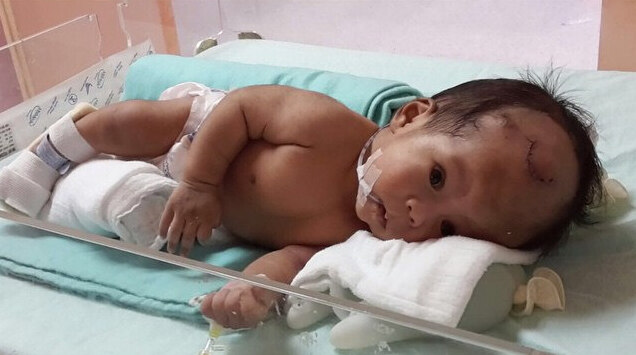
Baby recovering from shunt surgery

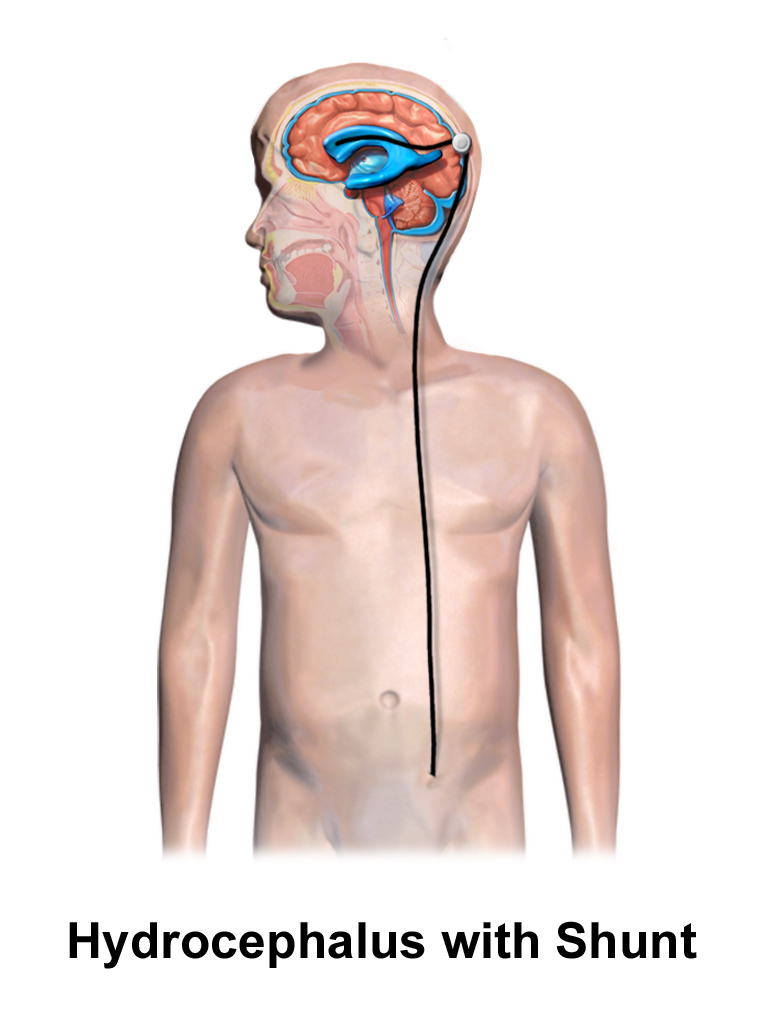
Ventriculoperitoneal shunt placement in child with hydrocephalus

Hydrocephalus is treated through surgery by creating a way for the excess fluid to drain away. An external ventricular drain (EVD), also known as an extraventricular drain or ventriculostomy, provides relief in the short term. In the long term, some people will need any of the various types of cerebral shunts. It involves the placement of a ventricular catheter (a tube made of silastic) into the cerebral ventricles. This creates a way to bypass the flow obstruction/malfunctioning arachnoidal granulations. The excess fluid drains into other body cavities where it can be resorbed. Most shunts drain the fluid into the peritoneal cavity (ventriculoperitoneal shunt). Other shunts drain the fluid into the right atrium (ventriculoatrial shunt), pleural cavity (ventriculopleural shunt), and gallbladder. A shunt system can also be placed in the lumbar space of the spine. This allows the excess fluid to be redirected to the peritoneal cavity (lumbar-peritoneal shunt). Another treatment for obstructive hydrocephalus is an endoscopic third ventriculostomy (ETV). This surgery creates an opening in the floor of the third ventricle so that CSF flows directly to the basal cisterns. This treatment can shortcut any obstruction like aqueductal stenosis. This may or may not be appropriate based on individual anatomy. Some infants can be treated with ETV and choroid plexus cauterization. Choroid plexus cauterization reduces the amount of cerebrospinal fluid produced by the brain. The technique, known as ETV/CPC, was pioneered in Uganda by neurosurgeon Benjamin Warf and is now in use in several U.S. hospitals.

=== External hydrocephalus ===
External hydrocephalus is generally seen in infants. It involves enlarged fluid spaces or subarachnoid spaces outside of the brain. The most common sign is a head circumference above the 90th percentile. In most cases, no other signs or symptoms are reported. Rarely reported symptoms include a tense anterior fontanel, developmental delay, seizures, irritability, and vomiting. Usually, this condition is benign. It resolves spontaneously by two to three years of age. Thus, it usually does not need insertion of a shunt. If surgical treatment is required, a ventriculoperitoneal shunt is usually preferred. Other treatment options include using medications like acetazolamide. The condition can be diagnosed and monitored with brain sonography and CT/MRI. These tests and a good medical history can help to identify external hydrocephalus from similar conditions: subdural hemorrhages or symptomatic chronic extra-axial fluid collections which are accompanied by vomiting, headaches, and seizures.

=== Shunt complications ===
Shunt surgery is one of the most common procedures in pediatric neurosurgery. Significant advances in shunt technology and surgical approaches have been made over the years. However, the lifetime risk for a revision surgery of a ventriculoperitoneal shunt in pediatric patients can reach up to 80%. Shunt failure rates are also high. Of the 40,000 surgeries performed annually for hydrocephalus, only 30% are a person's first surgery. Many patients require multiple revisions during their lives. Common complications requiring revision include:

1. overdrainage of cerebrospinal fluid
2. obstruction of the valve or catheter
3. infection
4. catheter disconnection/migration

If shunt failure occurs, the cerebrospinal fluid begins to accumulate again. This can cause a number of physical symptoms develop (headaches, nausea, vomiting, photophobia), some extremely serious, such as seizures. Patient factors that are associated with shunt failure includes the cause of the hydrocephalus, prematurity, male sex, spina bifida, epilepsy, severity of ventricular dilation, ethnicity, and age <1 year. The diagnosis of CSF buildup is complex and requires specialist expertise. Diagnosis can depend, for example, on whether symptoms occur when the person is upright or in a prone position (lying down) with the head at roughly the same level as the feet.

Overdrainage of cerebrospinal fluid occurs when the fluid drains more rapidly than it is produced by the choroid plexus. The rate of overdrainage is estimated to be about 10% to 12% within 6.5 years after shunt placement. Signs and symptoms of overdrainage includes:

- listlessness
- severe headaches
- irritability
- light sensitivity
- auditory hyperesthesia (sound sensitivity)
- hearing loss
- nausea
- vomiting
- dizziness
- vertigo
- migraines
- seizures
- a change in personality
- weakness in the arms or legs
- strabismus
- double vision (to appear when the person is vertical or standing)

If the person lies down, the symptoms usually vanish quickly. Resistance to traditional analgesic pharmacological therapy may also be a sign of shunt overdrainage or failure. A CT scan may or may not show any change in ventricle size, particularly if the person has a history of slit-like ventricles. It can be challenging to diagnose over-drainage. This can make treatment of overdrainage particularly frustrating for patients and their families. However, monitoring the intracranial pressure in combination with radiological findings has been found to be a useful tool for identifying cases of overdrainage. Prevention of this includes using adjustable pressure valves and integrated gravitational units. To alleviate the symptoms, a lumbar puncture or external lumbar or ventricular drainage can be used. To prevent chronic overdrainage, a valve exchange is recommended.

Shunt obstruction is the most common cause of shunt failure. The shunt can be obstructed at the catheter or the valve itself. Cases of shunt obstruction present with similar symptoms to untreated hydrocephalus (headaches, nausea, lethargy, etc.). It can be caused by tissue, bacteria, or kinking of the catheter. Diagnosis is usually made by shunt tapping and imaging studies like CT. Treatment involves replacing or flushing the shunt to address the cause of the obstruction and restore flow through the catheter.

The rate of initial shunt infection ranges from 3.6 to 12.6% The signs and symptoms of shunt infection are variable, but the most common include headache, nausea, fever, swelling, and lethargy. Shunt infections are most commonly diagnosed by culturing the cerebrospinal fluid. According to studies, the most common cause of infection are bacteria, followed by fungi. The bacterial Staphylococcal species, especially coagulase-negative Staphylococcus and Staphylococcus aureus, is responsible for almost 2/3 of shunt infections. It is believed that these organisms are introduced to the cerebrospinal fluid at the time of surgery. In the case of shunt infection, it is recommended to remove the shunt. place an external ventricular drain, and then place a new shunt. Current research is dedicated to methods to prevent such infections from occurring. Using antibiotics or different shunt hardware to prevent bacterial growth is being studied. As is the efficacy of more vigilant shunt surveillance. Standardized protocols for inserting cerebral shunts have been shown to reduce shunt infections. There is tentative evidence that preventative antibiotics may decrease the risk of shunt infections.

Shunt migration is a relatively uncommon complication that requires a shunt revision. The most common sites that the shunt catheter can migrate to include the scrotum (30.67% of cases), followed by through the anus (22% of cases). Less common sites include the large intestine, small intestine, stomach, and oral cavity. Signs and symptoms vary depending on the site of migration. For example, intestinal migrations may present with abdominal pain, fever, and vomiting, especially if it perforates the bowel. Anal migration often presents with no symptoms.

Following placement of a VP shunt, there have been cases of a decrease in post-surgery hearing. It is presumed that the cochlea aqueduct is responsible for the decrease in hearing thresholds. The cochlea aqueduct has been considered as a probable channel where CSF pressure can be transmitted. Therefore, the reduced CSF pressure could cause a decrease in perilymphatic pressure. This may cause secondary endolymphatic hydrops. In addition to the increased hearing loss, there have been findings of resolved hearing loss after ventriculoperitoneal shunt placement, where there is a release of CSF pressure on the auditory pathways.

== Epidemiology ==
It is estimated that congenital hydrocephalus occurs in 8.5 out of 10,000 live births globally. The disease burden is more concentrated in Africa, Asia, and South America. A study in 2019 estimated that there are 180,000 childhood hydrocephalus cases from the African continent per year. It also reported 90,000 cases from Southeast Asia and the Western Pacific. Congenital hydrocephalus was found to be associated with many factors. The health of the patient's mother being one such factor. With exposure to medications in the prenatal period (such as antibiotics) as another. Low socioeconomic status is also a factor. Though this may be bias due to low economic standing in the global south. In adults that are 18–64 years-old, about 11 in 100,000 cases of hydrocephalus is estimated. For adults over 65 years of age, 175 in 100,000 cases is estimated.

== History ==
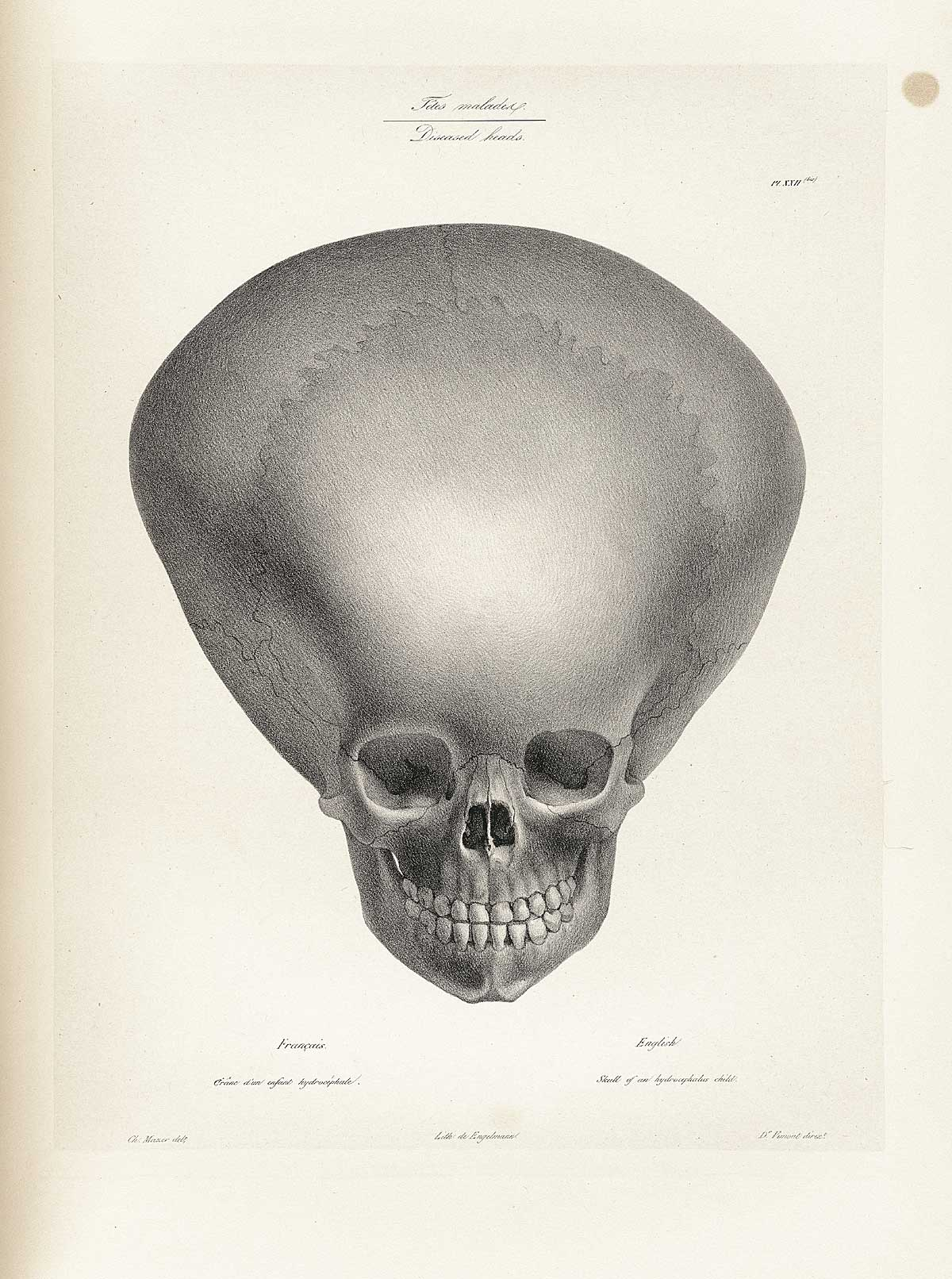
Skull of a hydrocephalic child (1800s)

In the pre-historic area, there were various paintings or artifacts depicting children or adults with macrocephaly (large head) or clinical findings of hydrocephalus. The earliest scientific description of hydrocephalus was written by the ancient Greek physician, Hippocrates. He coined the word 'hydrocephalus' from the Greek ὕδωρ, hydōr meaning 'water' and κεφαλή, kephalē meaning 'head'. A more accurate description was later given by the Roman physician Galen in the second century AD.

The first clinical description of an operative procedure for hydrocephalus appears in Al-Tasrif (1,000 AD). This was contributed by the Arab surgeon Abulcasis. He described the evacuation of superficial intracranial fluid in hydrocephalic children. In his chapter on neurosurgical disease, he stated that infantile hydrocephalus was caused by mechanical compression. Specifically, he wrote:

The skull of a newborn baby is often full of liquid, either because the matron has compressed it excessively or for other, unknown reasons. The volume of the skull then increases daily, so that the bones of the skull fail to close. In this case, we must open the middle of the skull in three places, make the liquid flow out, then close the wound and tighten the skull with a bandage.

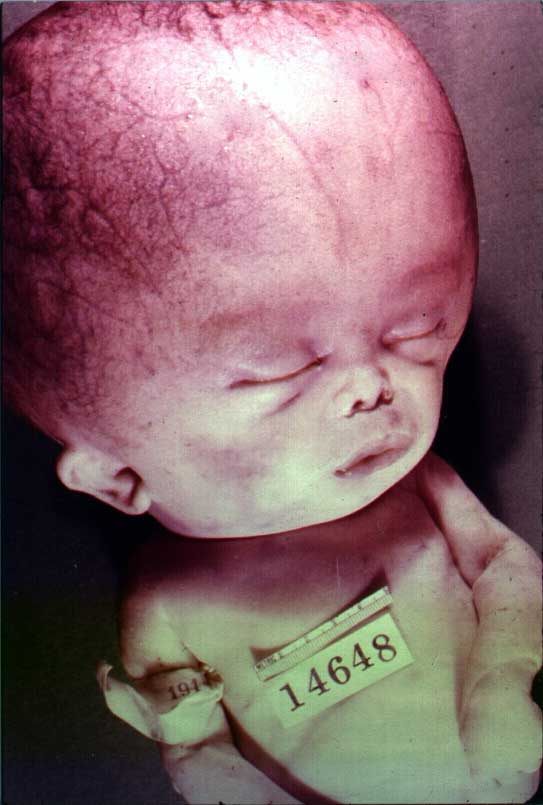
Historical specimen of an infant with severe hydrocephalus, probably untreated

In the 17th century Isbrand de Diemerbroeck proposed that the enlargement of an 18-month-old child's head was due to unhealthy diet. This diet would cause thick fluids to travel from the intestines to the skull. He proposed using a poultice and laxative to decrease the amount of fluids in the body. If those methods failed, he recommended a skin puncture to remove the fluid. In 1744, Claude-Nicolas Le Cat, a French surgeon, performed a ventricular puncture to treat a 3-month old with hydrocephalus. He attempted to perform this surgery a second time, but the patient did not survive. Also during the 18th century, an English physician, Michael Underwood, reported the symptoms associated with hydrocephalus. Describing vomiting, fever, dilated pupils, sensitivity to light, and diplopia. He also noted that patients eventually fell into a deep coma and died.

In 1881, Carl Wernicke pioneered sterile ventricular puncture and external drainage of CSF for the treatment of hydrocephalus. This occurred a few years after the landmark study of Retzius and Key. In 1891, Heinrich Quincke first described using a lumbar puncture to drain excess spinal fluid. This eventually led to investigating permanent treatment methods. This would require developing a continuous drain to treat hydrocephalus. In 1893, Jan MIkulicz-Radecki used a permanent shunt to drain CSF successfully. It was not until the 20th century that the cerebral shunt and other neurosurgical treatment modalities were developed. In the early 20th century, the role of the arachnoid villi in absorbing cerebrospinal fluid was confirmed by Harvey Cushing. He recommended draining the fluid into the retroperitoneal space rather than the scalp. He was the first to attempt to create a shunt to the external jugular vein using a transplanted vein from the patient's father. In the 1950s, the invention of radiotracers allowed for scientists to trace the flow of cerebrospinal fluid. These findings were critical for shaping future therapies and treatments of hydrocephalus.

The first cerebral shunt for treatment of hydrocephalus was placed in 1956. For the next 30 years, advances in shunt material and design were made, such as development of a valve system. Additionally, the invention of prenatal ultrasound made diagnosis of fetal hydrocephalus possible around the 1970s and 1980s. In the 1980s and 1990s, it was found that an endoscope could be used to more accurately place ventricular catheters. The advent of endoscopic procedures also resulted in endoscopic third ventriculostomies being used more commonly. This is an alternative method from shunt placement to treat hydrocephalus.

== Society and culture ==
=== Name ===
The word hydrocephalus is from the Greek ὕδωρ, hydōr meaning 'water' and κεφαλή, kephalē meaning 'head'. Other names for hydrocephalus include "water on the brain", a historical name, and "water baby syndrome".

=== Awareness ===
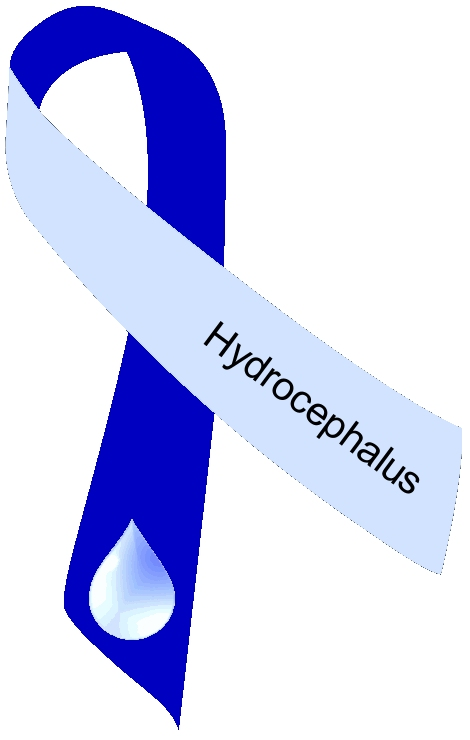
Hydrocephalus awareness ribbon

There are many organizations that advocate for hydrocephalus patients and promote research about its treatments. The Hydrocephalus Association was founded as a family support group in 1983 by parents of children with hydrocephalus. It has since expanded to a non-profit patient advocacy group, and has invested over $14 million in research since 2009. The National Hydrocephalus Foundation, also started by parents of a child with hydrocephalus, is a non-profit organization established in 1979. The Pediatric Hydrocephalus Foundation was founded in 2005 for similar purposes.

September was designated National Hydrocephalus Awareness Month in July 2009 by the U.S. Congress in H.Res. 373. The resolution campaign is due in part to the advocacy work of the Pediatric Hydrocephalus Foundation. Prior to July 2009, no awareness month for this condition had been designated.

=== Notable cases ===
- Ice hockey player Colby Cave had acute obstructive hydrocephalus due to a colloid cyst.
- Author Sherman Alexie, born with the condition, wrote about it in his semi-autobiographical junior fiction novel The Absolutely True Diary of a Part-Time Indian.
- Prince William, Duke of Gloucester (1689–1700), probably contracted meningitis at birth, which resulted in this condition.
- Emperor Ferdinand I of Austria (1793–1875) became emperor in 1835 despite various health issues including hydrocephalus and epilepsy.
- Masato Kudo, a professional football player, died of hydrocephalus on October 21, 2022.
- Danny Bonaduce, a TV and radio personality, revealed that he would be undergoing surgery for hydrocephalus that was impeding his ability to walk properly in 2023.
- King Charles II of Spain, known as El Hechizado ("the Bewitched"), is thought to have suffered from many diseases, including pituitary hormone deficiency, renal tubular acidosis, Klinefelter syndrome, fragile X syndrome, and hydrocephalus.
- King Bhumibol Adulyadej of Thailand was treated for hydrocephalus in 2015.
- On May 22, 2025, Billy Joel announced that he was cancelling his concerts while being treated for hydrocephalus.
- Lily Daly, a 7-year-old girl from Ireland, died at Children's Health Ireland at Temple Street Hospital in February 2019. She had had hydrocephalus and died after suffering cardiac arrest during an MRI scan.
- Roona Begum, a girl from India who has a severe form of congenital hydrocephalus, featured in Rooting for Roona

== See also ==
- Microcephaly
- Macrocephaly
