= Benjamin Warf =

American pediatric neurosurgeon

- Citizenship: United States
- Education: Georgetown College, B.S. (1980); Harvard Medical School, M.D. (1984)
- Awards: MacArthur Fellowship (2012)
- Scientific career
- Fields: Neurosurgery
- Workplaces: Boston Children's Hospital

Benjamin Warf is an American pediatric neurosurgeon. Warf was awarded a MacArthur Fellowship in 2012.

== Work and career ==
Warf is Professor of Neurosurgery at Harvard Medical School and holds the Hydrocephalus and Spina Bifida Chair at Boston Children's Hospital, where he serves as Director of Neonatal and Congenital Anomalies Neurosurgery. He also serves as Affiliate Faculty in the Department of Global Health and Social Medicine and the Program in Global Surgery and Social Change at Harvard Medical School. Warf is Chairman of the Board of Trustees of NeuroKids, a nonprofit that advocates for the treatment of children with neurological disorders in under-served areas around the world. He also serves on the Global Experts Panel of the International Federation for Spina Bifida and Hydrocephalus.

Warf grew up in Pikeville, Kentucky, where his father was a pastor. After graduating from Harvard Medical School in 1984, Warf completed his neurosurgical residency training at Case Western University in 1991, and was the first Fellow in Pediatric Neurosurgery at Boston Children's Hospital from 1991 to 1992. He joined the faculty of University of Kentucky College of Medicine in 1992, where he served as Chief of Pediatric Neurosurgery and Director of Surgical Education until 2000.

In 2000, Warf moved his wife and 6 children to Uganda to help establish the only pediatric neurosurgery specialty hospital in sub-Saharan Africa. There, he served as Medical Director and Chief of Surgery until 2006. While there, Warf pioneered a novel treatment for infant hydrocephalus using a minimally invasive endoscopic technique (ETV/CPC) that greatly reduces the number of children requiring implantation of and lifelong dependence on ventriculoperitoneal shunts.

This is a low-cost, low-risk alternative to the typical treatment for hydrocephalus. This procedure is known as an ETV/CPC, a combination of endoscopic third ventriculostomy and choroid plexus cauterization, which is now being performed in major children's medical centers throughout North America and internationally. In addition, Warf was the first to demonstrate neonatal ventriculitis as the single most common cause of infant hydrocephalus in that part of the world.

Warf is a recipient of the Humanitarian Award from the American Association of Neurological Surgeons and, in 2012, was named a MacArthur Fellow.
