= Endoscopic third ventriculostomy =

Surgical procedure for treatment of hydrocephalus

- Specialty: Neurosurgery

Endoscopic third ventriculostomy (ETV) is a surgical procedure for treatment of hydrocephalus in which an opening is created in the floor of the third ventricle using an endoscope placed within the ventricular system through a burr hole. This allows the cerebrospinal fluid to flow directly to the basal cisterns, bypassing the obstruction. Specifically, the opening is created in the translucent tuber cinereum on the third ventricular floor.

== Medical uses ==
The ETV procedure is used as an alternative to a cerebral shunt mainly to treat certain forms of noncommunicating obstructive hydrocephalus (such as aqueductal stenosis), but since the ETV was introduced as an accepted treatment modality the range of etiologies for which it is used has grown significantly. Whereas at first it was almost exclusively performed in patients with noncommunicating obstructive hydrocephalus (e.g. aqueductal stenosis or intracerebral tumor), in the present day patients with communicating obstructive hydrocephalus (e.g. post intracranial hemorrhage or post intracranial infection) also may be eligible for treatment by means of ETV.

== Complications ==
A major advantage of performing an endoscopic third ventriculostomy over placement of a cerebrospinal fluid shunt is the absence of an implanted foreign body. A shunt has risk of infection and failure for which subsequent surgery is needed. Complications of ETV include hemorrhage (the most severe being due to basilar artery rupture), injury to neural structures (e.g. hypothalamus, pituitary gland or fornix of the brain), and late sudden deterioration. Infection, hematoma, and cerebrospinal fluid leaks may present in the direct postoperative period.

== Failure of treatment ==
Failure of the ETV occurs. This can be due to occlusion of the ventriculostomy (e.g. closure of the ventriculostomy, formation of subarachnoid membranes in the pontine cistern or other mechanisms). Although 60 - 90% of failures occur in the first few months after treatment, long-term failure also occurs (failures occurring after 7 years have been reported). In a very small subgroup of patients a complication of ETV can be rapid late deterioration. The mechanism is not clear.

== Alternative treatment ==
When it is not possible to perform an ETV for different reasons, an alternative treatment is opening the lamina terminalis anterior to the third ventricle. The effectiveness of this approach is not certain.

The surgical treatment options for hydrocephalus are, as previously mentioned, implantation of a cerebral shunt and ETV. Especially in the youngest age group (younger than two years of age) it remains uncertain what is the superior treatment modality. Currently, a large international, multicenter study is conducted to address this issue. Patients under the age of two, diagnosed with aqueductal stenosis without a history of preterm birth or other associated brain anomalies are being included (International Infant Hydrocephalus Study).

== Combined with choroid plexus cauterization ==
There is a discussion regarding the additional benefit of combining endoscopic third ventriculostomy with choroid plexus cauterization. This combined procedure is referred by the abbreviation "ETV/CPC" and has also been called the "Warf Procedure" after Dr. Benjamin Warf. There have been research studies published about the experience of authors with this procedure. The lion's share of the data that show favorable results is reported on patients in Africa. More recent studies from research groups in Western countries also show that the combination of ETV with choroid plexus cauterization seems to be effective, safe, and durable, and that predictions for success are similar to those of ETV alone. The degree of choroid plexus cauterization in infants might be dependent on the experience of the neurosurgeon (learning curve) and thus surgeons training might improve results. The ETV/CPC procedure is now being performed in a number of hospitals in US and Canadian cities, including Seattle, Washington; Houston, Texas; Calgary, Alberta; Toronto, Ontario; Salt Lake City, Utah; and Boston, Massachusetts.

== Prediction of ETV success ==
The chances of success of treatment of a pediatric patient can be calculated using the ETV success score (ETVSS). The ETVSS is derived from patient age, etiology of hydrocephalus and history of previous cerebrospinal fluid shunt (e.g. ventriculo-peritoneal shunt). The percentage probability of ETV success = Age score + Etiology score + Previous shunt score. A two years old patient with hydrocephalus due to aqueductal stenosis, without previous shunt would have an 80% chance of success (40 for age + 30 for etiology + 10 for no previous shunt = 80).

ETVSS table

Score	Age	Etiology	Previous Shunt
0	< 1 month	Post-infectious	Previous shunt
10	1 month to < 6 months		No previous shunt
20		Myelomeningocele, intraventricular hemorrhage, non-tectal brain tumor	
30	6 months to < 1 year	Aqueductal stenosis, tectal brain tumor, other etiology	
40	1 year to < 10 years		
50	≥ 10 years		

The ETVSS was derived and validated without the use of adult data and it has inadequate discriminative ability in mixed adult and pediatric populations.

== Second ETV ==
After a patient gets readmitted with recurrent clinical and radiological symptomatology of hydrocephalus, it is unclear what the next step in treatment should be. Implantation of a cerebrospinal fluid shunt or repeat ETV. Data suggest that a second ETV might be worthwhile if implantation of cerebrospinal fluid shunt can be avoided.

== Training ETV ==
In most countries and neurosurgical centres, the ETV procedure is part of the basic neurosurgery training program. For the sake of teaching and practicing, various simulation models have been developed. Virtual reality simulators, and synthetic simulators. This allows neurosurgical trainees to practice skills in a low-risk environment. Educators can select either a virtual reality simulator or a physical model for the training of residents, the selection should be based on educational objectives. Where training focused on anatomy and using anatomical landmarks for decision making may better be aided with virtual reality model, the focus on familiarizing the resident with endoscopic equipment and developing manual dexterity may be better learned on a physical model. The technical skill and competency of a trainee can be evaluated using the Neuro-Endoscopic Ventriculostomy Assessment Tool (NEVAT).
