= Rooting for Roona =

- Directed by: Pavitra Chalam; Akshay Shankar
- Cinematography: Sujit Anand
- Edited by: Jyolsna Panicker
- Music by: Tapas Relia
- Production company: Curley Street
- Distributed by: Netflix
- Release date: 15 October 2020
- Running time: 41 minutes
- Country: India
- Languages: Bengali; English

Rooting for Roona is a 2020 Indian documentary short film created, and directed by Pavitra Challam and Akshay Shankar. The film is based on the story of a girl named Roona Begum born with hydrocephalus. The film is produced by Curley Street and was released on Netflix on 15 October 2020.

== Reception ==
Udita Jhunjhunwala from the Firstpost gave 3.5 stars out of 5 and wrote, "The documentary sensitively captures not only Roona’s unusual case, but also the impact and stress on a young married couple on raising the child."

== Awards ==
- Audience Award for Best Short Film at the South Asian Film Festival of Orlando.
