= NUAK2 =

Protein-coding gene in humans

Identifiers
- Aliases: NUAK2, SNARK, NUAK family kinase 2, ANPH2
- External IDs: OMIM: 608131; MGI: 1921387; GeneCards: NUAK2
Enzyme activity
EC #	BRENDA	ExPASy	KEGG	MetaCyc
2.7.11.1	↗	↗	↗	↗

Gene location (Human)
Chr.	Chromosome 1 (human)
Band	1q32.1	Start	205,302,063 bp
Band	1q32.1	End	205,321,745 bp

Gene location (Mouse)
Chr.	Chromosome 1 (mouse)
Band	1|1 E4	Start	132,243,864 bp
Band	1|1 E4	End	132,261,226 bp
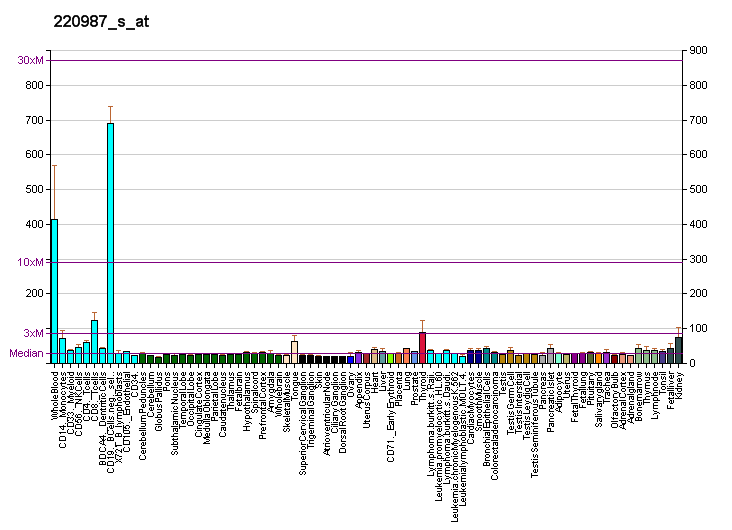
RNA expression pattern
Bgee	Human / Mouse (ortholog); Top expressed in: blood; mucosa of ileum; gingival epithelium; mucosa of pharynx; granulocyte; epithelium of esophagus; palpebral conjunctiva; renal medulla; mucosa of transverse colon; kidney tubule / Top expressed in: right kidney; jejunum; granulocyte; proximal tubule; human kidney; mesenteric lymph nodes; ileum; epithelium of lens; colon; duodenum; More reference expression data
BioGPS	More reference expression data
Gene ontology
Molecular function	nucleotide binding; protein binding; protein kinase activity; metal ion binding; kinase activity; transferase activity; protein serine/threonine kinase activity; ATP binding; magnesium ion binding
Cellular component	cytoplasm; nucleus
Biological process	phosphorylation; apoptotic process; actin cytoskeleton organization; negative regulation of apoptotic process; intracellular signal transduction; protein phosphorylation; cellular response to glucose starvation
Sources:Amigo / QuickGO
Orthologs
Databases	NCBI: entry; OMA: entry
Species	Human	Mouse
Entrez	81788	74137
Ensembl	ENSG00000163545	ENSMUSG00000009772
UniProt	Q9H093	Q8BZN4
RefSeq (mRNA)	NM_030952	NM_001195025; NM_028778
RefSeq (protein)	NP_112214	NP_001181954; NP_083054
Location (UCSC)	Chr 1: 205.3 – 205.32 Mb	Chr 1: 132.24 – 132.26 Mb
PubMed search
- Wikidata
View/Edit Human	View/Edit Mouse

NUAK family SNF1-like kinase 2 also known as SNF1/AMP kinase-related kinase (SNARK) is an enzyme that in humans is encoded by the NUAK2 gene. Its deficiency in humans causes anencephaly, a severe form of anterior neural tube defect that curtails brain development.
