= Diploid-triploid mosaicism =

Human chromosome disorder

- Other names: Diploidy triploidy, 2n/3n mixoploidy, triploidy mosaicism, diploid triploid mosaic, DTM, mosaic triploid
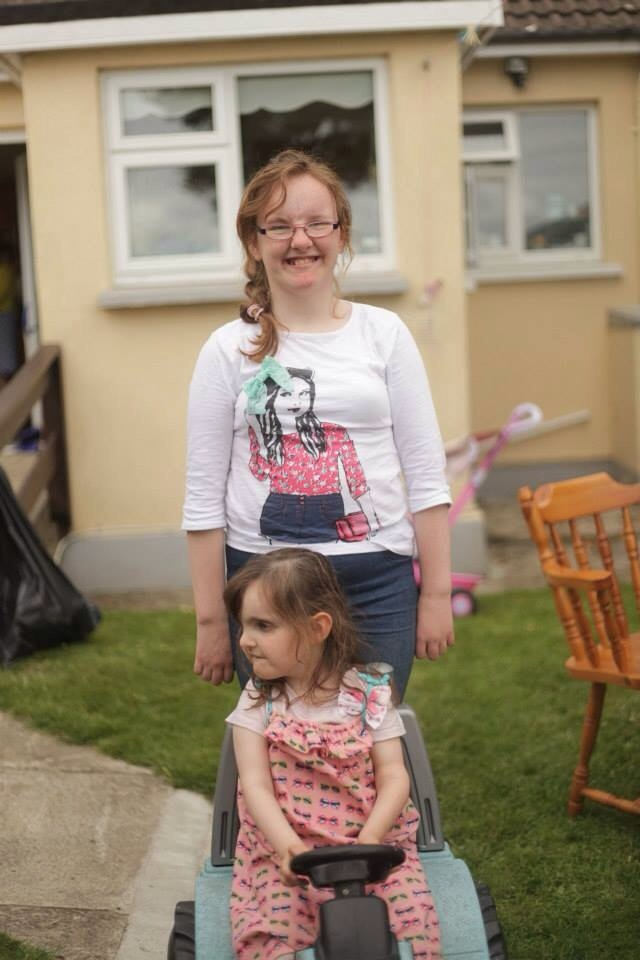
- Two children with diploid-triploid mosaicism
- Specialty: Medical genetics

Diploid-triploid mosaicism is a human chromosome disorder. Individuals with diploid-triploid syndrome have some cells with three copies of each chromosome for a total of 69 chromosomes (called triploid cells) and some cells with the usual 2 copies of each chromosome for a total of 46 chromosomes (called diploid cells).

Having two or more different cell types is called mosaicism. Diploid-triploid mosaicism can be associated with truncal obesity, body/facial asymmetry, weak muscle tone (hypotonia), delays in growth, mild differences in facial features, fusion or webbing between some of the fingers and/or toes (syndactyly) and irregularities in the skin pigmentation. Intellectual disabilities may be present but are highly variable from person to person ranging from mild to more severe. The chromosome disorder is usually not present in the blood; a skin biopsy, or analyzing cells in the urine is needed to detect the triploid cells.

Diploid-triploid individuals may have the karyotypes 46,XX/69,XXX or 46,XX/69,XXY. Individuals with 46,XX/69,XXY karyotype typically develop as phenotypically male, but may also exhibit disorders of sexual development. Almost all diploid-triploid individuals who are phenotypically female have the karyotype 46,XX/69,XXX, but a case has been reported where a 46,XX/69,XXY individual developed as phenotypically female.

Triploidy is distinct from trisomy, in which only one chromosome exists in three pairs.

== See also ==
- Triploid syndrome
