= Aqueductal stenosis =

Narrowing of the aqueduct of Sylvius

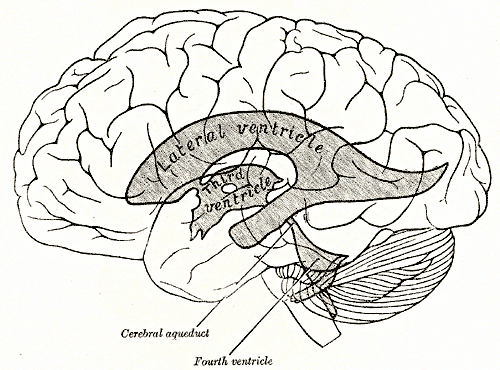
- Drawing of the ventricular system from Gray's Anatomy, with third and fourth ventricles and the aqueduct of Sylvius (cerebral aqueduct) labeled
- Specialty: Neurosurgery

Aqueductal stenosis is a narrowing of the aqueduct of Sylvius which blocks the flow of cerebrospinal fluid (CSF) in the ventricular system. Blockage of the aqueduct can lead to hydrocephalus, specifically as a common cause of congenital and/or obstructive hydrocephalus.

The aqueduct of Sylvius is the channel which connects the third ventricle to the fourth ventricle and is the narrowest part of the CSF pathway with a mean cross-sectional area of 0.5 mm^{2} in children and 0.8 mm^{2} in adults. Because of its small size, the aqueduct is the most likely place for a blockage of CSF in the ventricular system. This blockage causes ventricle volume to increase because the CSF cannot flow out of the ventricles and cannot be effectively absorbed by the surrounding tissue of the ventricles. Increased volume of the ventricles will result in higher pressure within the ventricles, and cause higher pressure in the cortex from it being pushed into the skull. A person may have aqueductal stenosis for years without any symptoms, and a head trauma, hemorrhage, or infection could suddenly invoke those symptoms and worsen the blockage.

== Signs and symptoms ==
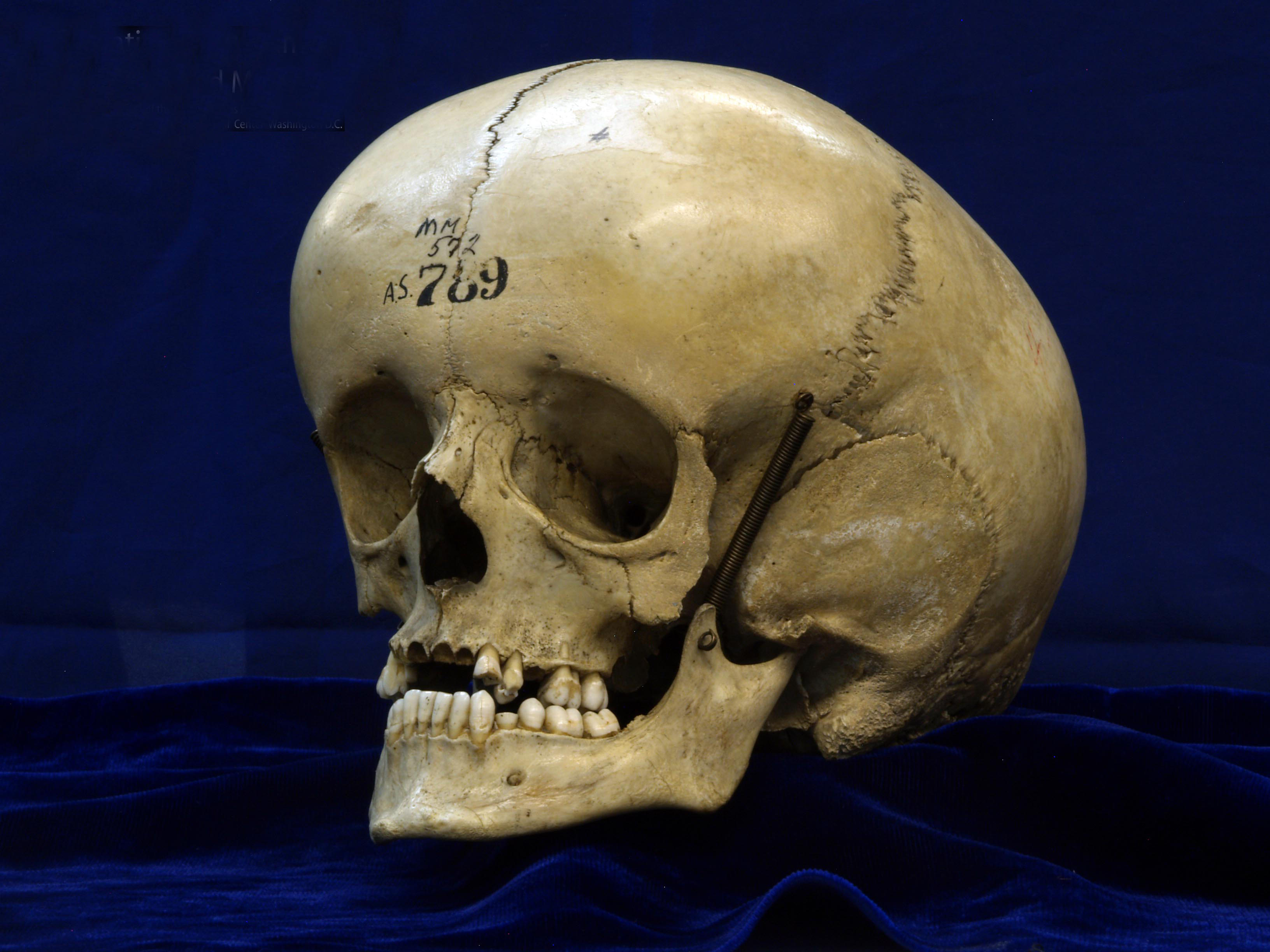
The enlarged skull of a person with hydrocephalus, which is a symptom of the excess CSF in the ventricular system. This may be caused by aqueductal stenosis, and in some cases, it is thought that hydrocephalus will cause aqueductal stenosis.

Many of the signs and symptoms of aqueductal stenosis are similar to those of hydrocephalus. These typical symptoms include: headache, nausea and vomiting, cognitive difficulty, sleepiness, seizures, balance and gait disturbances, visual abnormalities, and incontinence.

- Headache may be a result of the raised intracranial pressure from the disrupted flow of CSF, and sometimes this symptom may come on suddenly as a “thunderclap headache”.
- In children, cognitive difficulty and developmental delay have been seen in a range of severities. Mild developmental delay is characterized by motor and neurological development that is no greater than 2 standard deviations below average for the age of the child, and moderate delay is characterized by greater than 2 standard deviations below. A child with severe delay may be unable to use spoken language or control movement or interact with others, and can behave abusively towards themselves.
- A patient's level of consciousness may also deteriorate with time, and this can lead to coma or death.
- The visual abnormalities previously mentioned include “upward gaze palsy”, where a person has difficulty looking up.
- Tremors have also been reported as a symptom, but are not as common as these previously mentioned.

Signs of aqueductal stenosis other than those mentioned in “Causes of stenosis” include detection of an enlarged lateral and third ventricle in conjunction with a smaller fourth ventricle. This variation in ventricle size is indicative of a blockage in the aqueduct because it lies between the third and fourth ventricles. Another sign of stenosis is deformation of the midbrain, which can be severe. This is caused by the pressure gradient formed from a blockage in the aqueduct.

== Causes ==
=== Tumor compression ===
In cases of aqueductal stenosis caused by tumor compression, a brain tumor in the region of the midbrain forms. More specific anatomically, a tumor forms in the pineal region which is dorsal to the midbrain and is level with the aqueduct of Sylvius. As the tumor grows and expands, it compresses the aqueduct to eventually obstruct it.

=== Narrow aqueduct ===
A naturally narrow aqueduct allows for it to be more easily obstructed. Narrow aqueducts have no unusual tissue characteristics, and ventricles are lined with normal epithelial cells. Narrowing can be a defect from birth that results in congenital aqueductal stenosis. Developmental errors that could result in this defect include abnormal folding of the neural plate which causes the neural tube to be narrowed from birth.

=== Forking ===
Forking refers to an aqueduct that has become split into multiple, separate channels as a result of incomplete fusion of the median fissure. These channels may connect back together to form a single aqueduct again, or they may abruptly stop and form a dead-end. Both of these deformations disrupt the laminar flow of CSF through the ventricular system, causing the force by the aqueduct on its surroundings to be lower than the compressive force being applied to the aqueduct. This greater compressive force could effectively stop the flow of CSF if the aqueduct closes due to the force.

=== Septum formation ===
Formation of a septum implies that through gliosis, a membrane of glial cells has developed across the aqueduct. This abnormal membrane most commonly forms at the lower and distal portion of the aqueduct, and completely obstructs the canal. This barricade causes the portion of the aqueduct above it to become dilated with the excess CSF which in turn applies more pressure to the cells in this upper part. This increased pressure amplifies the effects of gliosis, as described in the next section.

=== Gliosis ===
With this condition, the aqueduct begins as partially blocked. To compensate for the partial blockage and increase the CSF flow to normal rates, the pressure in the third ventricle is increased thereby also increasing the velocity of the CSF. This in turn creates more shear stress in the aqueduct, causing more damage to the epithelial cells lining the ventricle, and resulting in gliosis and a proliferation of glial cells. This increased number of cells thus causes the blockage to worsen, necessitating more pressure and velocity, and continuing the cycle of gliosis.

=== Other medical conditions ===
A genetic disorder called “Brickers-Adams-Edwards syndrome” or “X-linked hydrocephalus” has been discovered that leads to aqueductal stenosis. This disease is transmitted from mother to son. This disorder is caused by a point mutation in the gene for neural cell adhesion. Most males born with this have severe hydrocephalus, adducted thumbs, spastic motions, and intellectual problems. Females with this defect may have adducted thumbs or subnormal intelligence.

Bacterial meningitis can also result in gliotic blockage of the aqueduct. In utero infection or infection during infancy could both result in glial cell build-up to make an obstruction.

== Connection to hydrocephalus ==
It is generally considered that aqueductal stenosis is a precursor to non-communicating hydrocephalus, as the blockage of the aqueduct would result in the accumulation of CSF seen in hydrocephalus. However, some studies also argue that cases of aqueductal stenosis not involving a brain tumor are actually a result of communicating hydrocephalus, rather than a cause of it. When a patient has communicating hydrocephalus, the lateral ventricles and medial parts of the temporal lobes expand and compress the aqueduct. As a result, the pressure within the fourth ventricle drops and causes the aqueduct to close more tightly. This in effect could make aqueductal stenosis a byproduct of hydrocephalus. It is estimated that only 25% of males with X-linked hydrocephalus have aqueductal stenosis, which supports the theory that the stenosis may sometimes be a symptom of hydrocephalus.

== Diagnosis ==
Ventricular system with third ventricle highlighted red

Ventricular system with fourth ventricle highlighted red

=== CT scan ===
CT scans are used to visualize the structure of the inside of the body without needing to make any incision. For the purposes of diagnosis aqueductal stenosis, a scan is performed on a patient's brain. Images showing an enlarged third ventricle along with a normally sized fourth ventricle (in a lateral view) is generally considered to be an indication of aqueductal stenosis, but this is still only presumption. CT scans are typically used after a shunt treatment in order to analyze ventricle size and determine if the device is working. One complication associated with this analysis (as well as when analyzed by MRI) is that images of a small ventricle do not always correspond with a functioning shunt as a small ventricle would seem to imply. The reduced ventricle size can sometimes be due to a condition called slit ventricle syndrome. Another complication is that if the stenosis is caused by tumor compression, there is a possibility that the scan will miss detecting small brainstem tumors.

=== MRI imaging ===
MRI is considered the best method of detecting aqueductal stenosis because it can visualize the entire length of the aqueduct, can clearly depict tumors, and can show ventricle enlargement or other deformations. It is helpful in determining the extent of the aqueductal obstruction, particularly when multiple masses or lesions are present, and thereby aids in determining the most appropriate treatment method (i.e. surgery, shunt, or ETV). When constructive interference in steady state (CISS) or fast imaging employing steady-state acquisition (FIESTA) sequence are used, subtle abnormalities or partial obstructions in the aqueduct can be depicted in the MRI. For example, CISS can be used to determine if a thin membrane interfering with CSF flow is present.

=== Other ===
Phase contrast-MRI is an imaging method that is more sensitive than MRI for analysis of the pulsatile CSF flow in the ventricular system. This method takes multiple images of the ventricles within one cardiac cycle to measure the flow of CSF running past the area of acquisition. If no flow is seen, this is a reliable diagnosis of aqueductal stenosis as it implies that there is a blockage of CSF.

Ultrasonography can be used in utero to diagnose aqueductal stenosis by showing dilation of the lateral and third ventricles. A retrospective study found that diagnosis can be made as early as 19 weeks of gestation, and that on average diagnosis is made at 33 weeks.

== Treatments ==
The general purpose of the following treatment methods is to divert the flow of CSF from the blocked aqueduct, which is causing the buildup of CSF, and allow the flow to continue. Another goal of these treatments is to reduce the stress within the ventricles. Studies have not shown that either of the following treatments results in a higher IQ of the patient, and there is no statistical difference in a patient's quality of life based on treatment method. The following treatment methods are not used for aqueductal stenosis caused by tumor compression; if the obstruction is a direct result of tumor compression, CSF flow may be normalized by the surgical removal of the tumor.

=== Extracranial shunt ===
An extracranial shunt is essentially a sturdy tube with a catheter on one end to drain the third ventricle. The shunt also has a valve which serves to maintain one-way flow of the CSF and regulates the flow rate. The end with the catheter is placed in the third ventricle to drain the excess CSF and the other end is placed in the peritoneal cavity or atrium of the heart (making it a ventriculoperitoneal or ventriculoatrial shunt, respectively). The excess CSF which is diverted to a cavity is then reabsorbed by the surrounding tissue where it is drained to.

The procedure to insert this device is a technically straightforward endoscopic surgery with a low mortality rate (essentially 0% mortality since the 1970s). If the shunt has an adjustable valve the current method of setting the valve pressure is to choose one setting, observe the patient to see if CSF flow improves and the symptoms lessen over time, and adjust the pressure setting as needed if improvement isn't seen. For example, if there is not enough CSF flow, another surgery is performed to lower the valve pressure so that less force needs to be applied to open the valve and thereby drain more CSF.

This treatment method has several possible problems with it (with a 50% failure rate in 2 years), and unfortunately shunt malfunctions and associated complications cause a death rate of 1.2% per year. Problems which can necessitate a secondary surgery to fix them include: mechanical failure, incorrect catheter size, inappropriate valve drainage pressure, and infection.

- Inappropriate valve pressure can lead to "overdraining" or "underdraining", both of which should be treated by adjusting the valve pressure. Overdraining occurs when the valve pressure is too low and CSF flows out of the third ventricle too quickly. The ventricle then collapses and blood vessels can be torn in the process. This in turn can lead to headache, hemorrhage, or slit ventricle syndrome. Underdraining occurs when the valve pressure is too high and CSF flows out too slowly. This results in symptoms of hydrocephalus as the CSF is still collecting rather than being absorbed or diverted.
- Risk of infection is due to the fact that a foreign object is being introduced into the body. Infection can have symptoms of fever and soreness of the neck and shoulders.

=== Endoscopic third ventriculostomy ===
An endoscopic third ventriculostomy (ETV) is a procedure where an incision is made in the bottom of the third ventricle to make a drainage point for CSF to flow out of. The procedure is minimally invasive and is performed endoscopically. The goal in the surgery is to create a path for communication between the third ventricle and the subarachnoid space outside the brain for reabsorption of CSF. ETV has a higher failure rate than shunting during the first 3 postoperative months, but after this time the risk of failure progressively drops to become half as high as the failure risk for shunting.

This treatment does not place a foreign body into the patient so there is a much lower risk of infection as compared to a shunt procedure. Along with not implanting a device, this procedure avoids mechanical issues like disconnection, over or underdrainage, and valve dysfunction. The surgery begins by entering the right or left lateral ventricle endoscopically through a burr hole. The third ventricle is identified and entered as well, and an incision is made in the floor of the ventricle and enlarged as necessary with tools such as forceps or Fogarty catheters. If a membrane prevents CSF flow between the ventricle and the subarachnoid space, then an incision is made in the membrane as well. Ideally this procedure can be performed near the midline of the brain with minimal side-to-side motions of the endoscope so as to not tear tissues and cause further complications.

Research has found that this procedure has a 75% success rate, that 72% of ETV surgeries are still correctly functioning after 15 years, and that patients have shorter hospital stays recovering as compared to shunting. If the procedure does not successfully cure the aqueductal stenosis, a second surgery can be performed to enlarge the incision or implant a shunt. Problems that can lead to these failures and require additional surgery include the stoma becoming closed or a new membrane forming across the stoma over time. Currently there is no universal decision about whether this should be performed in children, as infants have a higher tendency to have a membrane form over the incision which means that an additional surgery would have to be performed.
