= Facing the World =

Facing the World is a UK-registered charity, promoting surgery for children with facial differences. It was founded in 2002 by two surgeons, Martin Hirigoyen Kelly and Norman Waterhouse, and was originally focused on bringing children from the developing world to the UK for surgery.

Over time it came to focus mostly on Vietnam, and on training Vietnamese doctors in the surgeries, sending UK doctors to Vietnam to perform surgeries, and providing equipment to Vietnamese hospitals; it became active in Vietnam in 2008. It has cooperated with two hospitals in Hanoi and a hospital in Da Nang.

== See also ==
- Effects of Agent Orange on the Vietnamese people
