= Neural tube defect =

Group of birth defects of the brain or spinal cord

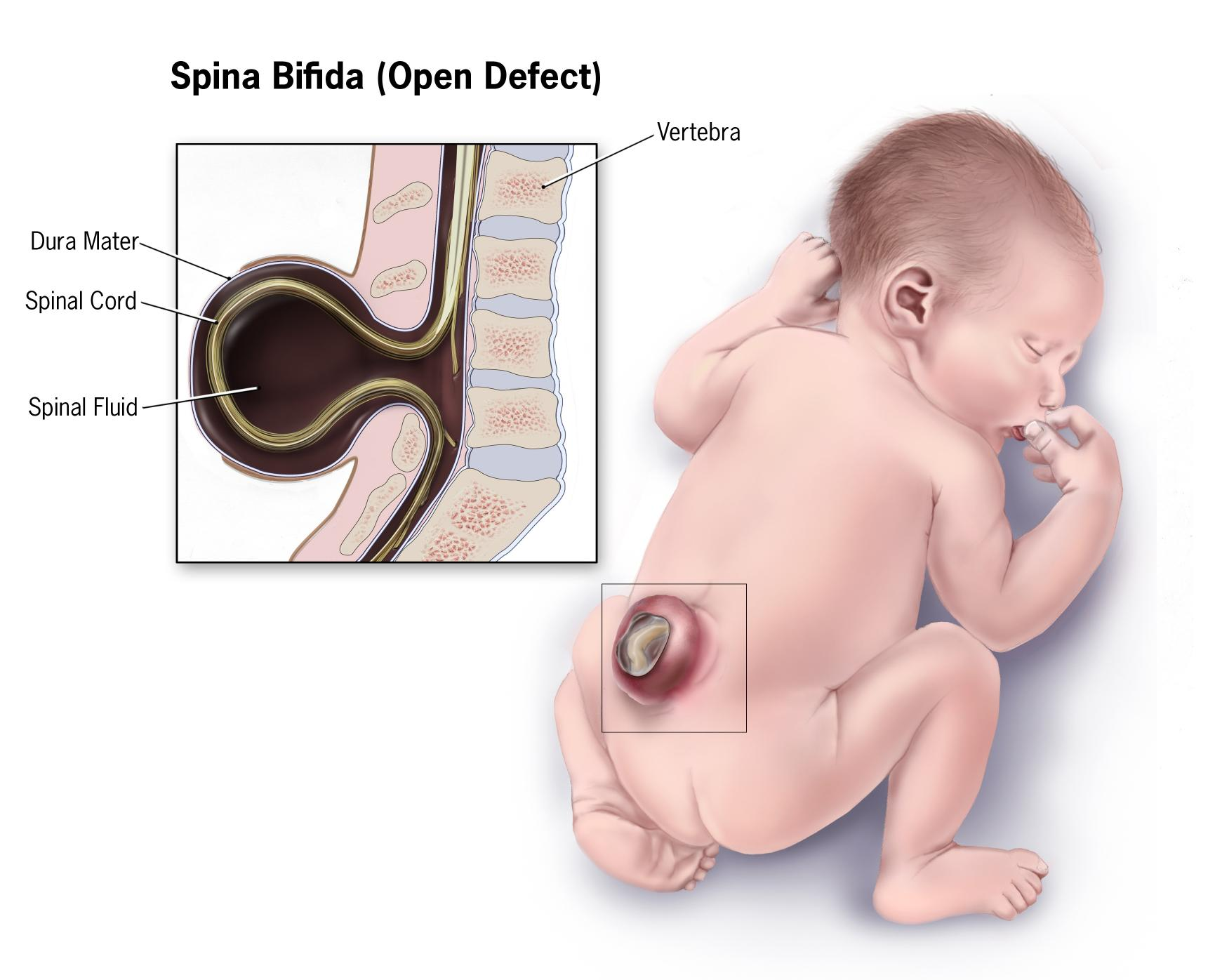
- Illustration of a child with spina bifida, the most common NTD
- Specialty: Medical genetics
- Frequency: 0.075%

Neural tube defects (NTDs) are a group of birth defects in which an opening in the spine or cranium remains from early in human development. In the third week of pregnancy called gastrulation, specialized cells on the dorsal side of the embryo begin to change shape and form the neural tube. When the neural tube does not close completely, an NTD develops.

Specific types include: spina bifida which affects the spine, anencephaly which results in little to no brain, encephalocele which affects the skull, and iniencephaly which results in severe neck problems.

NTDs are one of the most common birth defects, affecting over 300,000 births each year worldwide. For example, spina bifida affects approximately 1,500 births annually in the United States, or about 3.5 in every 10,000 (0.035% of US births), which has decreased from around 5 per 10,000 (0.05% of US births) since folate fortification of grain products was started. The number of deaths in the US each year due to neural tube defects also declined from 1,200 before folate fortification was started to 840.

== Types ==
There are two classes of NTDs: open, which are more common, and closed. Open NTDs occur when the brain and/or spinal cord are exposed at birth through a defect in the skull or vertebrae (spinal column). Open NTDs include anencephaly, encephaloceles, hydranencephaly, iniencephaly, schizencephaly, and the most common form, spina bifida. Closed NTDs occur when the spinal defect is covered by skin. Types of closed NTDs include lipomeningocele, lipomyelomeningocele, and tethered cord.

=== Anencephaly ===
Anencephaly (without brain) is a severe neural tube defect that occurs when the anterior-most end of the neural tube fails to close, usually during the 23rd and 26th days of pregnancy. This results in an absence of a major portion of the brain and skull. Infants born with this condition lack the main part of the forebrain and are usually blind, deaf and display major craniofacial anomalies. The lack of a functioning cerebrum will prevent the infant from even gaining consciousness. Infants are either stillborn or usually die within a few hours or days after birth. For example, anencephaly in humans can result from mutations in the NUAK2 kinase.

=== Encephaloceles ===
Encephaloceles are characterized by protrusions of the brain through the skull that are sac-like and covered with membrane. They can be a groove down the middle of the upper part of the skull, between the forehead and nose, or the back of the skull. Due to the range in its location, encephaloceles are classified by the location as well as the type of defect it causes. Subtypes include occipital encephalocele, encephalocele of the cranial vault, and nasal encephaloceles (frontoethmoidal encephaloceles and basal encephaloceles), with approximately 80% of all encephaloceles occurring in the occipital area. Encephaloceles are often obvious and diagnosed immediately. Sometimes small encephaloceles in the nasal and forehead are undetected. Despite the wide range in its implications, encephaloceles are most likely to be caused by improper separation of the surface ectoderm and the neuroectoderm after the closure of the neural folds in the fourth week of gastrulation.

=== Hydranencephaly ===
Hydranencephaly is a condition in which the cerebral hemispheres are missing and instead filled with sacs of cerebrospinal fluid. People are born with hydranencephaly, but most of the time, the symptoms appear in a later stage. Newborns with hydrancephaly can swallow, cry, sleep and their head is in proportion to their body. However, after a few weeks, the infants develop increased muscle tone and irritability. After a few months, the brain start to fill with cerebrospinal fluid (hydrocephalus). This has several consequences. Infants start to develop problems with seeing, hearing, growing, and learning. The missing parts of the brain and the amount of cerebrospinal fluid can also lead to seizures, spasm, problems with regulating their body temperature, and breathing and digestion problems. Besides problems in the brain, hydranencephaly can also be seen on the outside of the body. Hydrocephalus leads to more cerebrospinal fluid in the brain, which can result in an enlarged head.

The cause of hydranencephaly is not clear. Hydranencephaly is a result of an injury of the nervous system or an abnormal development of the nervous system. The neural tube closes in the sixth week of the pregnancy, so hydranencephaly develops during these weeks of the pregnancy. The cause of these injuries/development is not clear.

Theories regarding the causes of hydrancephaly include:

- blockage in the carotid artery: some researchers think that a blockage of the carotid artery leads to the under-/no development of the brain.
- inherited condition.
- infections: during the pregnancy, a woman can develop an infection in the uterus what can lead to problems with the neural tube.
- environmental toxins: during the pregnancy, a woman can be exposed to environmental toxins that may have effect on the health of the infant.

=== Iniencephaly ===
Iniencephaly is a rare neural tube defect that results in extreme bending of the head to the spine. The diagnosis can usually be made on antenatal ultrasound scanning, but if not will undoubtedly be made immediately after birth because the head is bent backwards and the face looks upwards. Usually the neck is absent. The skin of the face connects directly to the chest and the scalp connects to the upper back. Individuals with iniencephaly generally die within a few hours after birth.

=== Spina bifida ===
Spina bifida is further divided into two subclasses, spina bifida cystica and spina bifida occulta.

- Spina bifida cystica includes meningocele and myelomeningocele. Meningocele is less severe and is characterized by herniation of the meninges, but not the spinal cord, through the opening in the spinal canal. Myelomeningocele involves herniation of the meninges as well as the spinal cord through the opening.
- Spina bifida occulta means hidden split spine. In this type of neural tube defect, the meninges do not herniate through the opening in the spinal canal. The most frequently seen form of spina bifida occulta is when parts of the bones of the spine, called the spinous process, and the neural arch appear abnormal on a radiogram, without involvement of the spinal cord and spinal nerves. The risk of recurrence in those who have a first degree relative (a parent or sibling) is 5–10 times greater compared to the general population.

== Causes ==
=== Folate deficiency ===
Inadequate levels of folate (vitamin B_{9}) and vitamin B_{12} during pregnancy have been found to lead to increased risk of NTDs. Although both are part of the same biopathway, folate deficiency is much more common and therefore more of a concern. Folate is required for the production and maintenance of new cells, for DNA synthesis and RNA synthesis. Folate is needed to carry one carbon groups for methylation and nucleic acid synthesis. It has been hypothesized that the early human embryo may be particularly vulnerable to folate deficiency due to differences of the functional enzymes in this pathway during embryogenesis combined with high demand for post translational methylations of the cytoskeleton in neural cells during neural tube closure. Failure of post-translational methylation of the cytoskeleton, required for differentiation has been implicated in neural tube defects. Vitamin B_{12} is also an important receptor in the folate biopathway such that studies have shown deficiency in vitamin B_{12} contributes to risk of NTDs as well. There is substantial evidence that direct folic supplementation increases blood serum levels of bioavailable folate even though at least one study have shown slow and variable activity of dihydrofolate reductase in human liver. A diet rich in natural folate (350 μg/d) can show as much increase in plasma folate as taking low levels of folic acid (250 μg/d) in individuals However a comparison of general population outcomes across many countries with different approaches to increasing folate consumption has found that only general food fortification with folic acid reduces neural tube defects. While there have been concerns about folic acid supplementation being linked to an increased risk for cancer, a systematic review in 2012 shows there is no evidence except in the case of prostate cancer which indicates a modest increase in risk.

Choline, closely linked to folate metabolism, is essential for fetal development and is tenfold enriched in amniotic fluid compared to maternal serum levels. Its deficiency is strongly associated with NTDs, possibly due to hypomethylation in fetal progenitor cells or impaired acetylcholine synthesis, which may regulate neuronal growth and differentiation. Studies in mice show that perinatal choline supplementation reduces neurodevelopmental abnormalities and improves memory, spatial skills, and exploratory behavior in offspring.

There have been studies showing the relationship between NTDs, folate deficiency and the difference of skin pigmentation within human populations across different latitudes. There are many factors that would influence the folate levels in human bodies: (i) the direct dietary intake of folic acid through fortified products, (ii) environmental agents such as UV radiation. In concern with the latter, the UV radiation-induced folate photolysis has been shown via in vitro and in vivo studies to decrease the folate level and implicate in etiology of NTDs not only in humans but other amphibian species. Therefore, a protection against the UV radiation-induced photolysis of folate is imperative for the evolution of human populations living in tropical regions where the exposure to UV radiation is high over the year. One body natural adaptation is to elevate the concentration of melanin inside the skin. Melanin works as either an optical filter to disperse the incoming UV radiation rays or free radical to stabilize the hazardous photochemical products. Multiple studies have demonstrated the highly melanized integument as a defense against folate photolysis in Native Americans or African Americans correlates with lower occurrence of NTDs in general.

=== Genetic deficiencies ===
As reported by Bruno Reversade and colleagues, the inactivation of the NUAK2 kinase in humans leads to anencephaly. This fatal birth defect is believed to arise as a consequence of impaired HIPPO signalling. Other genes such as TRIM36 have also been associated with anencephaly in humans.

=== Gene-environment interaction ===
A deficiency of folate itself does not cause neural tube defects. The association seen between reduced neural tube defects and folic acid supplementation is due to a gene-environment interaction such as vulnerability caused by the C677T methylenetetrahydrofolate reductase (MTHFR) variant. Supplementing folic acid during pregnancy reduces the prevalence of NTDs by not exposing this otherwise sub-clinical mutation to aggravating conditions. Other potential causes can include folate antimetabolites (such as methotrexate), mycotoxins in contaminated corn meal, arsenic, hyperthermia in early development, and radiation. Maternal obesity has also been found to be a risk factor for NTDs. Studies have shown that both maternal cigarette smoking and maternal exposure to secondhand smoke increased the risk for neural tube defects in offspring. A mechanism by which maternal exposure to cigarette smoke could increase NTD risk in offspring is suggested by several studies that show an association between cigarette smoking and elevations of homocysteine levels. Cigarette smoke during pregnancy, including secondhand exposure, can increase the risk of neural tube defects. All of the above may act by interference with some aspect of normal folic acid metabolism and folate linked methylation related cellular processes as there are multiple genes of this type associated with neural tube defects.

In addition to MTHFR variants, genetic polymorphisms in methylenetetrahydrofolate dehydrogenase 1 (MTHFD1) can also influence NTDs risk by increasing the body's dependence on choline-derived methyl groups to compensate for impaired folate metabolism. One study found that premenopausal women with MTHFD1 variants were significantly more likely to experience organ dysfunction related to choline insufficient and had a heightened risk of NTDs in pregnancy.

=== Other ===
Folic acid supplementation reduces the prevalence of neural tube defects by approximately 70%, indicating that 30% are not folate-dependent and are due to some cause other than alterations of methylation patterns. Multiple other genes related to neural tube defects exist which are candidates for folate insensitive neural tube defects. There are also several syndromes such as Meckel syndrome, and triploid syndrome which are frequently accompanied by neural tube defects that are assumed to be unrelated to folate metabolism

== Diagnosis ==
Tests for neural tube defects include ultrasound examination and measurement of maternal serum alpha-fetoprotein (MSAFP). Second trimester ultrasound is recommended as the primary screening tool for NTDs, and MSAFP as a secondary screening tool. This is due to increased safety, increased sensitivity and decreased false positive rate of ultrasound as compared to MSAFP. Amniotic fluid alpha-fetoprotein (AFAFP) and amniotic fluid acetylcholinesterase (AFAChE) tests are also used to confirming if ultrasound screening indicates a positive risk. Often, these defects are apparent at birth, but acute defects may not be diagnosed until much later in life. An elevated MSAFP measured at 16–18 weeks gestation is a good predictor of open neural tube defects, however the test has a very high false positive rate, (2% of all women tested in Ontario, Canada between 1993 and 2000 tested positive without having an open neural tube defect, although 5% is the commonly quoted result worldwide) and only a portion of neural tube defects are detected by this screen test (73% in the same Ontario study). MSAFP screening combined with routine ultrasonography has the best detection rate although detection by ultrasonography is dependent on operator training and the quality of the equipment.

== Prevention ==
Incidence of neural tube defects has been shown to decline through maintenance of adequate folic acid levels prior to and during pregnancy. This is achieved through dietary sources and supplementation of folic acid. In 1996, the United States Food and Drug Administration published regulations requiring the addition of folic acid to enriched breads, cereals, flour and other grain products. Similar regulations made it mandatory to fortify selected grain products with folic acid in Canada by 1998. During the first four weeks of pregnancy (when most women do not even realize that they are pregnant), adequate folate intake is essential for proper operation of the neurulation process. Therefore, any individuals who could become pregnant are advised to eat foods fortified with folic acid or take supplements in addition to eating folate-rich foods to reduce the risks of serious birth defects. In Canada, mandatory fortification of selected foods with folic acid had been shown to reduce the incidence of neural tube defects by 46% compared to incidence prior to mandatory fortification. However, relying on eating a folate-rich diet alone is not recommended for preventing neural tube defects when trying to conceive because a regular diet usually does not contain enough folate to reach pregnancy requirements. All individuals who have the ability to become pregnant are advised to get 400 micrograms of folic acid daily. This daily 400 mcg dose of folic acid can be found in most multivitamins advertised as for women. Higher doses can be found in pre-natal multivitamins but those doses may not be necessary for everyone. Individuals who have previously given birth to a child with a neural tube defect and are trying to conceive again may benefit from a supplement containing 4.0 mg daily, following advice provided by their doctor. In Canada, guidelines on folic acid intake when trying to conceive is based on a risk assessment of how likely they are to experience a neural tube defect during pregnancy. Risk is divided into high, moderate, and low risk categories. High risk would include those that had a past experience with neural tube defects, either themselves or during another pregnancy. Medium risk individuals are those with certain conditions that put them at higher risk for experiencing a neural tube defect. These include having a first or second degree relative or partner with a history of neural tube defects, having a gastrointestinal condition that affects normal absorption patterns, advanced kidney disease, kidney dialysis, alcohol over-use, or had another pregnancy resulting in a congenital abnormality that was folate sensitive. Medium risk individuals would also include those taking medications that can interfere with folate absorption such as anticonvulsants, metformin, sulfasalazine, triamterene, and trimethoprim. Low risk would include everyone else that do not fall into either medium or high risk categories. Recommendations on when to start folic acid supplementation for all individuals looking to become pregnant is at least three months preconception. If an individual is in the high risk category, the recommended dose is 4–5 mg of folic acid daily until 12 weeks gestation and then decrease to 0.4–1 mg until 4–6 weeks postpartum or for however long breastfeeding lasts. If an individual is in the medium risk category, the recommended dose is 1 mg of folic acid daily until 12 weeks gestation and then they can either continue at 1 mg or decrease to 0.4 mg daily until 4–6 weeks postpartum or however long breastfeeding lasts. If the pregnancy is low risk to develop a neural tube defect then the recommendation for that individual is 0.4 mg daily until 4–6 weeks postpartum or however long breastfeeding lasts. All dose recommendations and risk assessment should be done with the advice of a qualified health care provider.

== Treatment ==
As of 2008, treatments of NTDs depends on the severity of the complication. No treatment is available for anencephaly and infants usually do not survive more than a few hours. Aggressive surgical management has improved survival and the functions of infants with spina bifida, meningoceles and mild myelomeningoceles. The success of surgery often depends on the amount of brain tissue involved in the encephalocele. The goal of treatment for NTDs is to allow the individual to achieve the highest level of function, and independence. Fetal surgery in utero before 26 weeks gestation has been performed with some hope that there is benefit to the outcome including a reduction in Arnold–Chiari malformation and thereby decreases the need for a ventriculoperitoneal shunt but the procedure is very high risk for both mother and baby and is considered extremely invasive with questions that the positive outcomes may be due to ascertainment bias and not true benefit. Further, this surgery is not a cure for all problems associated with a neural tube defect. Other areas of research include tissue engineering and stem cell therapy but this research has not been used in humans.

== Epidemiology ==
Deaths from neural tube defects per million persons in 2012 0–0 1–1 2–3 4–6 7–10 11–15 16–20 21–28 29–69

Neural tube defects resulted in 71,000 deaths globally in 2010. It is unclear how common the condition is in low income countries.

Prevalence rates of NTDs at birth used to be a reliable measure for the actual number of children affected by the diseases. However, due to advances in technology and the ability to diagnose prenatally, the rates at birth are no longer reliable. Measuring the number of cases at birth may be the most practical way, but the most accurate way would be to include stillbirths and live-births. Most studies that calculate prevalence rates only include data from live births and stillborn children and normally exclude the data from abortions and miscarriages. Abortions are a huge contributing factor to the prevalence rates; one study found that in 1986 only a quarter of the pregnancies with an identified NTD were aborted, but that number had already doubled by 1999. Through this data, it is clear that excluding data from abortions could greatly affect the prevalence rates. This could also possibly explain why prevalence rates have appeared to drop. If abortions are not being included in the data but half of the identified cases are being aborted, the data could show that prevalence rates are dropping when they actually are not. However, it is unclear how much of an impact these could have on prevalence rates due to the fact that abortion rates and advances in technology vary greatly by country.

There are many maternal factors that also play a role in prevalence rates of NTDs. These factors include things like maternal age and obesity all the way to things like socioeconomic status along with many others. Maternal age has not been shown to have a huge impact on prevalence rates, but when there has been a relationship identified, older mothers along with very young mothers are at an increased risk. While maternal age may not have a huge impact, mothers that have a body mass index greater than 29 double the risk of their child having an NTD. Studies have also shown that mothers with three or more previous children show moderate risk for their next child having an NTD.
