= Triploid syndrome =

Chromosomal disorder in which there are three copies of every chromosome

- Other names: 69,XXX 2n/3n mixoploidy, 3n syndrome, chromosome triploidy syndrome, diploid/triploid mixoploidy, triploidy, triploidy syndrome
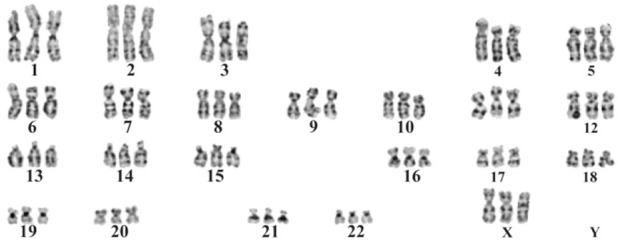
- A karyotype of a fetus with triploidy
- Specialty: Medical genetics
- Differential diagnosis: Trisomy 13 (Patau syndrome), trisomy 18 (Edwards syndrome)

Triploid syndrome, also called triploidy, is a chromosomal disorder in which a fetus has three copies of every chromosome instead of the normal two. If this occurs in only some cells, it is called mosaic triploidy and is less severe.

Most embryos with triploidy miscarry early in development.

== Signs and symptoms ==
Many organ systems are affected by triploidy, but the central nervous system and skeleton are the most severely affected:

Common central nervous system defects seen in triploidy include holoprosencephaly, hydrocephalus (increased amount of cerebrospinal fluid within the brain), ventriculomegaly, Arnold–Chiari malformation, agenesis of the corpus callosum and neural tube defects.

Skeletal manifestations include cleft lip/palate, hypertelorism, micrognathia, club foot and syndactyly.

Congenital heart defects, hydronephrosis, omphalocele, microphthalmia, macroglossia and meningocele (spina bifida) are also common. Cystic hygromas occur but are uncommon.

Triploid fetuses have intrauterine growth restriction beginning early in the pregnancy, as early as 12 weeks, and does not affect the head as severely as the body. Oligohydramnios, low levels of amniotic fluid, is common in triploid pregnancies. Placental abnormalities are common in triploidy. Most frequently, the placenta is enlarged and may have cysts within. In some cases, the placenta may be unusually small, having ceased to grow.

During the first trimester, fetuses with triploidy have a thicker fluid under the skin behind their neck, which calls for observation during the first and second trimester of gestation.

The mother will usually have high levels of specific proteins including maternal serum alpha-fetoprotein (AFP) and beta-human chorionic gonadotropin (hCG). Symptoms may include, but are not limited to, swelling, edema, or hypertension.

== Causes ==
Triploidy is caused by an extra set of chromosomes.

Triploidy can result from diandric fertilization, where either two sperm or a single diploid sperm fertilize one egg (polyspermy) (60%) or digynic fertilization, where from one sperm fertilizes an egg with two copies of every chromosome (40%).

== Diagnosis ==
Triploidy may be suggested by dramatically elevated levels of serum alpha-fetoprotein. On obstetric ultrasonography, abnormalities of the skeleton, central nervous system, heart, abdomen, and kidneys are visible in the most severe cases beginning at 12–14 weeks of pregnancy. Placental abnormalities associated with a triploid pregnancy become visible at 12–14 weeks. Placentomegaly or intrauterine growth restriction are the typical findings that prompt evaluation for triploidy, though oligohydramnios may be the first sign in some cases. Placentomegaly is not pathognomonic for triploidy because in some cases, the placenta senesces.

Triploidy must be distinguished from trisomy 13 and trisomy 18, which may appear similar on sonography. Genetic testing allows for a definitive diagnosis.

A sample of amniotic fluid can also be tested to diagnose triploidy.

== Prognosis ==
Most fetuses with triploidy do not survive to birth, and those that do usually die within days. As there is no treatment for triploidy, palliative care is given if a baby survives to birth. If triploidy is diagnosed during the pregnancy, termination is often offered as an option due to the additional health risks for the mother (pre-eclampsia, a life-threatening condition, or choriocarcinoma, a type of cancer). Should a mother decide to carry until term or until a spontaneous miscarriage occurs, doctors will monitor her closely in case either condition develops.

Mosaic triploidy has an improved prognosis, but affected individuals have moderate to severe cognitive disabilities.

== Epidemiology ==
Triploidy affects approximately 1–2% of pregnancies, but most miscarry early in development. At birth, males with triploidy are 1.5 times more common than females.

== See also ==
- Polyploid
- Diploid triploid mosaic
