= Iniencephaly =

Rare neural tube defect characterised by fusion of the occiput with the spine

- Other names: Iniencephaly clausus
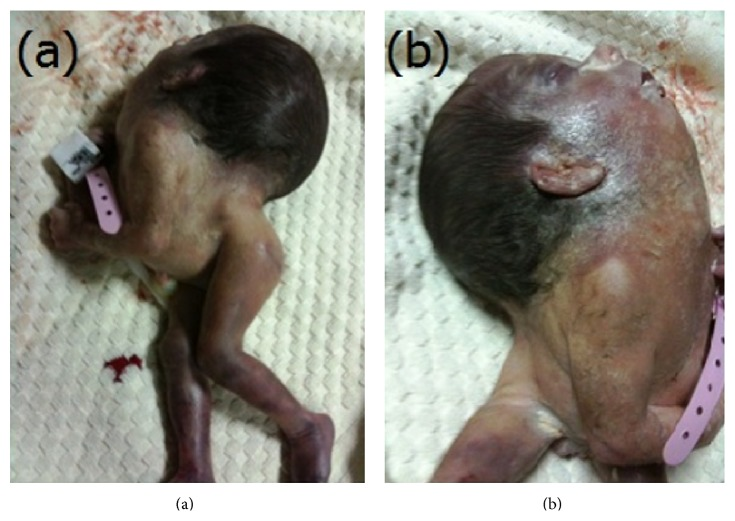
- Iniencephaly showing a stargazing head and an enlarged skull
- Symptoms: Neural malformations
- Usual onset: Congenital
- Duration: Long term
- Types: Iniencephaly apertus, Iniencephaly clausus
- Causes: Folate deficiency
- Diagnostic method: Prenatal screening
- Differential diagnosis: Klippel–Feil syndrome
- Prevention: Mother taking Folic acid
- Treatment: None
- Medication: None
- Prognosis: Fatal in severe cases that involve fetal development, but those with the mildest symptoms may live into adulthood
- Frequency: Rare

Iniencephaly is a rare type of cephalic disorder characterised by three common characteristics: a defect to the occipital bone, spina bifida of the cervical vertebrae and retroflexion (backward bending) of the head on the cervical spine. Stillbirth is the most common outcome, with a few rare examples of live birth, after which death invariably occurs within a short time.

The disorder was first described by Étienne Geoffroy Saint-Hilaire in 1836. The name is derived from the Ancient Greek word ἰνίον inion, for the occipital bone/nape of the neck.

== Classifications ==
There are two types of iniencephaly. The more severe group is iniencephaly apertus (open iniencephaly), involving the development of an encephalocele. In the other group, iniencephaly clausus (closed iniencephaly), the encephalocele is absent.

== Signs and symptoms ==
The affected infant tends to be short, with a disproportionately large head. The fetal head of infants born with iniencephaly are hyperextended while the foramen magnum is enlarged and opens through the widened pedicles. The defective neural arches directly into the upper cervical reach of the spinal canal, causing the formation of a common cavity between most of the spinal cord and the brain. The skin of the anterior chest is connected directly to the face, bypassing the formation of a neck, while the scalp is directly connected to the skin of the back. Because of this, those born with this anomaly either have a highly shortened neck or no neck at all. This causes extreme retroflexion, or backward bending, of the head in a "star-gazing" fashion. The spine is severely distorted as well along with significant shortening due to marked lordosis. The vertebrae, especially cervical, are fused together in abnormal shapes and their numbers are reduced. The spinal cord is almost always defective while the ventricular system is often dilated and the cortex is thinned. Sometimes, in the case of iniencephaly apertus, an encephalocele (sac-like protrusions of the brain through an opening in the cranium) forms.

=== Additional symptoms ===
Additional symptoms include:

- anencephaly (failure of major sections of the brain to form)
- encephalocele (cranial contents protrudes from the skull)
- cyclopia (the two eye cavities fuse into one)
- agnathia
- cleft palate
- arthrogryposis
- clubfeet
- holoprosencephaly
- spina bifida
- low-set ears
- pulmonary hypoplasia
- omphalocele
- gastroschisis
- cardiovascular disorders
- diaphragmatic hernias
- gastrointestinal atresia
- single umbilical artery
- renal abnormalities
- genu recurvatum
- hydramnios

== Causes ==
Though the iniencephaly is not genetic with its cause unknown, studies have shown that there are certain factors that can increase the risk of mothers giving birth to children with these anomalies.

=== Chromosomal abnormalities ===
Abnormalities in chromosomes such as trisomy 18, trisomy 13, and monosomy X have been shown to be tied to this disorder.

=== Environmental factors ===
Mothers with poor socioeconomic conditions, poor nutrition, low parity, and lack of folic acid supplementation, and/or hyperhomocysteinemia have shown to be at larger risk.

=== Drugs ===
Animal studies have shown that administration of the drugs vinblastine, streptonigrin, triparano, sulfonamide, tetracycline, antihistamines, and antitumor agents to pregnant mothers have resulted in offspring born with iniencephaly. The drug clomiphene, a drug commonly used for ovulation stimulation in fertility treatments, has also been seen to be associated with iniencephaly.

=== Obesity ===
Studies have shown that obesity of the mother increases the risk of neural tube disorders such as iniencephaly by 1.7 fold while severe obesity increases the risk by over 3 fold.

=== History of iniencephaly ===
Once a mother has given birth to a child with iniencephaly, risk of reoccurrence increases to 1-5%.

== Pathogenesis ==
The exact pathogenesis of iniencephaly is still unknown though there are proposed theories, most of which view the neural tube malformation from the primary neural anomaly standpoint. Marin-Padilla has proposed that the cause for the abnormalities has to do with a deficiency in the primary mesoderm. P. Erdinçler, et al. suggests from their findings that the cause of the anomaly is actually a defect in the occipital bone and rachischisis of the posterior vertebral arches leading to herniation of neural tissue through the opening in the bone during gestation.

== Diagnosis ==
The most accurate method of diagnosis is prenatal screening through real-time fetal images. However, since maternal body habitus leads to diagnostic difficulties using this method, MRI and sonography are the most commonly used technique since there is no exposure to ionizing radiation. At the beginning of the second trimester, the central nervous system (CNS) and anatomic structures of the fetus can be clearly visualized and the characteristic malformations of iniencephaly, such as a shortened trunk, marked lordosis in the cervicothoracic vertebrae, absence or partial absence of the occipital squama, abnormal fusion of vertebrae, closed vertebral arches, formation of an encephalocele (for iniencephaly apertus), and dorsiflexion of the head in respect to the spine, can be precisely diagnosed as well as the severity and location established. Once established, further decisions can be made with regard to terminating the pregnancy or providing a plan of adequate postnatal care.

=== Differential diagnosis ===
Since many of the characteristics of iniencephaly, such as congenital retroflexion of the spine and fusion of the cervical vertebrae, are shared with other disorders, key differences are important to note.

While anencephaly experiences a partial to total lack of the neurocranium, iniencephaly does not. In anencephaly, the retroflexed head is not covered with skin while in iniencephaly, the retroflexed head is covered with skin entirely. Cervical vertebrae are malformed and reduced in iniencephaly while they are almost normal in anencephaly.

Even though KFS does experience malformed cervical vertebra due to failure of segmentation during early fetal development, there is not retroflexion of the head as seen in iniencephaly. While iniencephaly clausus is fatal, KFS is not and can be surgically corrected. Therefore, it is crucial to correctly diagnose KFS and not mistake it for iniencephaly clausus.

== Prevention ==
Pregnant mothers are advised to take folic acid supplements to reduce risk of iniencephaly by up to 70%. Pregnant mothers are also advised not to take antiepileptic drugs, diuretics, antihistamines, and sulfa drugs, all of which have been associated with increased risk for neural tube defects.

== Treatment ==
Since newborns with iniencephaly so rarely survive past childbirth, a standard treatment does not exist.

== Prognosis ==
Iniencephaly of both types carry a lethal prognosis, sometimes even ending in spontaneous abortion or stillborns. Most infants die within hours of childbirth. There are only seven reported cases of relatively long-term survival of those born with iniencephaly.

== Epidemiology ==
Iniencephaly is thought to make up around 1% of all fetal abnormalities, with an incidence rate estimated at 0.1 to 10 in 10,000 deliveries. For unknown reasons, this disease seems to occur most often in newborn females (about 90%).
