= Neurohydrodynamics =

Neurohydrodynamics is a division of neurophysics that focuses on the hydrodynamics of the neurological system. It applies physical principles and design concepts to neurophysics seeking to close the gap between fluid mechanics and neurosurgical and neurological medicine. It combines fluid mechanics principles with neuroscience to improve neurological disorder healthcare diagnosis, monitoring and therapy.

Neurohydrodynamics investigates the role of intracranial fluid hydrodynamics (e.g. cerebrospinal fluid, cerebral blood flow, and interstitial fluid) in the pathophysiology of neurological disorders such as hydrocephalus, Chiari malformation, syringomyelia, pseudotumor cerebri, cerebral vasospasm, Alzheimer's disease, multiple sclerosis and cerebral aneurysm.

Neurohydrodynamics is an emerging discipline within neurophysics. Such an evolution is common as a new field transitions from being an interdisciplinary specialization among already-established fields, to being considered a field in itself. Much of the work in neurohydrodynamics consists of clinical research and in vitro or computational modeling, spanning a broad array of subfields. Prominent neurohydrodynamic applications include the development of cerebral shunts, lumbar-peritoneal shunts, intrathecal pumps, neural drug delivery systems and various diagnostic and therapeutic medical devices ranging from clinical equipment to micro-implants. Neurohydrodynamics relies heavily on neuroimaging modalities such as flow sensitized MRI.

== Founding figures ==
- Anthony Marmarou (deceased) - Nemuth Distinguished Professor and Vice Chair of Research in the Department of Neurosurgery, Medical College of Virginia Hospitals of Virginia Commonwealth University. Well known for his commitment to research on Traumatic Brain Injury (TBI) and Normal Pressure Hydrocephalus (NPH), Dr. Marmarou was considered a world authority on fluid dynamics within the brain and spinal cord. Dr. Marmarou was the recipient of the prestigious Javits Neuroscience Investigator Award from the National Institute of Neurological Disorders and Stroke.
- Salomón Hakim (June 4, 1929 in Barranquilla, Bogotá - May 5, 2011) was a Colombian neurosurgeon, researcher, and inventor. A descendant of Lebanese immigrants, he is known for his work on neurosurgery and for the precursor of the modern valve treatment for hydrocephalus.
- Hans Chiari (September 4, 1851 − 1916) was an Austrian pathologist who described in 1891 a brain malformation that is characterized by abnormalities in the region where the brain and spinal cord meet, and it causes part of the cerebellum to protrude through the foramen magnum (bottom of the skull) into the spinal canal. This was to be called the Arnold-Chiari malformation, named after Chiari and German pathologist, Julius Arnold (1835 − 1915). The malformation was given its name in 1907 by two of Dr. Arnold's students.
