= LPH =

LPH may refer to

- La Palma Intercommunity Hospital, in La Palma, California.
- A US Navy hull classification symbol: Landing platform helicopter (LPH)
- Left posterior hemiblock, a cardiovascular disease
- Liberal Party of Honduras
- β-lipotropin, a hormone
- Ankh wedja seneb, often abbreviated as L.P.H. in Egyptological translation
- Locality-preserving hashing
- Los Pollos Hermanos, a fictional fast-food restaurant chain that specializes in fried chicken operating across the southwestern United States in the AMC crime dramas, Breaking Bad and Better Call Saul
- Low pressure hydrocephalus
