= ShuntCheck =

Diagnostic medical device

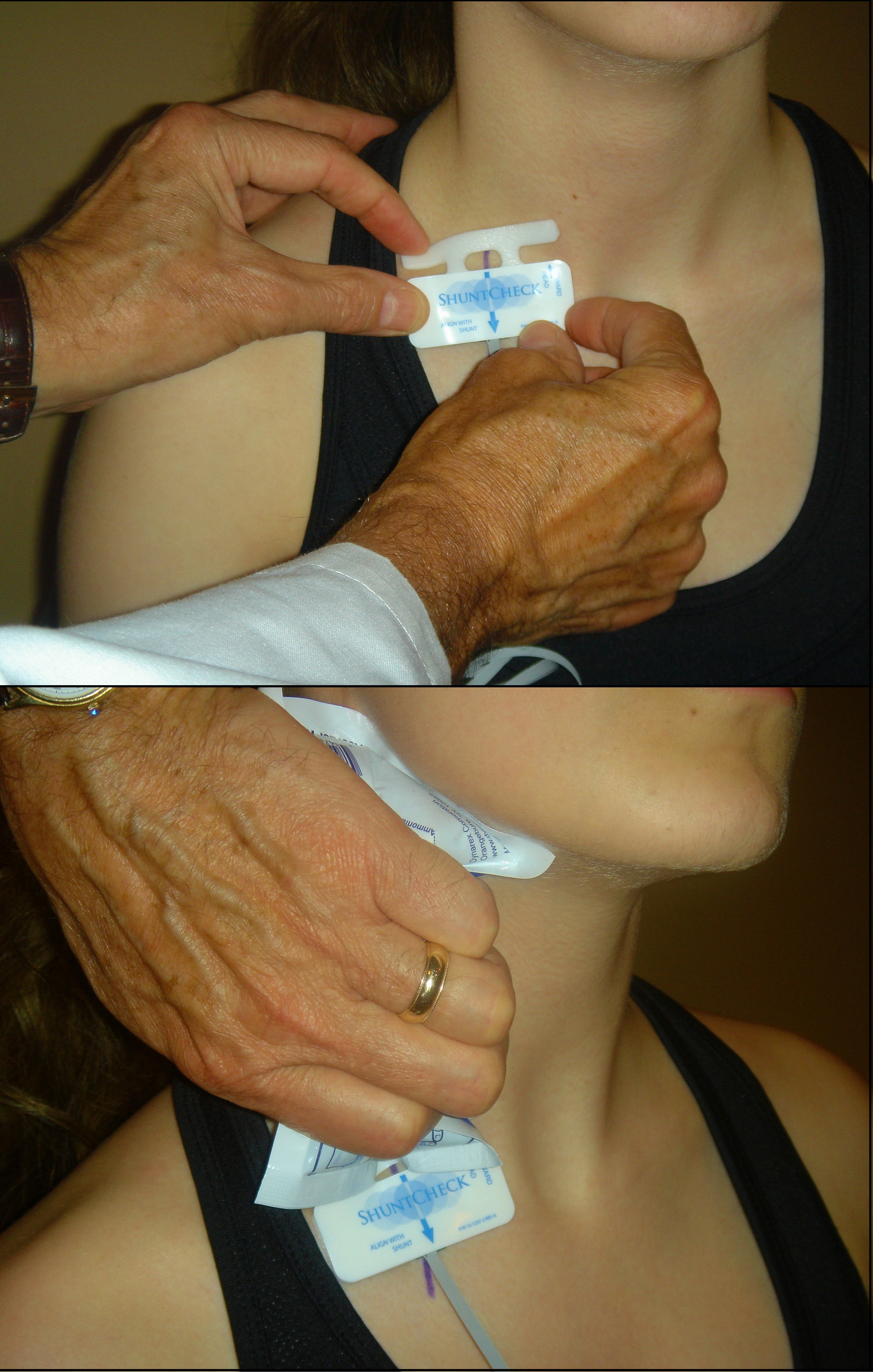
- ShuntCheck Sensor & Ice Placement
- Uses: Detects flow in the cerebral shunts of hydrocephalus patients
- Approach: Non-invasive

ShuntCheck is a non-invasive diagnostic medical device which detects flow in the cerebral shunts of hydrocephalus patients. Neurosurgeons can use ShuntCheck flow results along with other diagnostic tests to assess shunt function and malfunction.

Hydrocephalus is a condition in which cerebrospinal fluid (CSF) accumulates in the brain, potentially leading to brain damage and death. It is corrected by a shunt which drains excess CSF from the brain to the abdomen. Shunts fail, typically by obstruction – a life-threatening medical condition requiring the surgical replacement of the shunt. The symptoms of shunt failure are non-specific – headache, nausea, lethargy – so diagnostic tests must be conducted to rule in or rule out surgery. Current methods of diagnosing shunt malfunction, including CT Scan, MRI, radionuclide studies and shunt tap, have limitations and risks. These limitations and risks led to the development of ShuntCheck.

ShuntCheck uses thermal dilution to detect flow. The ShuntCheck sensor, a high-tech skin thermometer, is placed over the shunt where it crosses the clavicle. The shunt, which lies just below the skin, is cooled with an ice pack placed “upstream” of the sensor. If CSF is flowing through the shunt, the cooled fluid will move “downstream” and the ShuntCheck sensor will detect a drop in temperature. Faster shunt flow results in greater temperature decreases. If the shunt is not flowing, the cooled fluid remains upstream and no temperature drop is recorded.

The sensor is connected to a laptop or tablet computer running ShuntCheck software. The sensor is connected to a laptop or tablet computer running ShuntCheck software. The computer analyzes the thermal data, determines “Flow Confirmed” or “Flow NOT Confirmed” and presents a time-temperature graph.

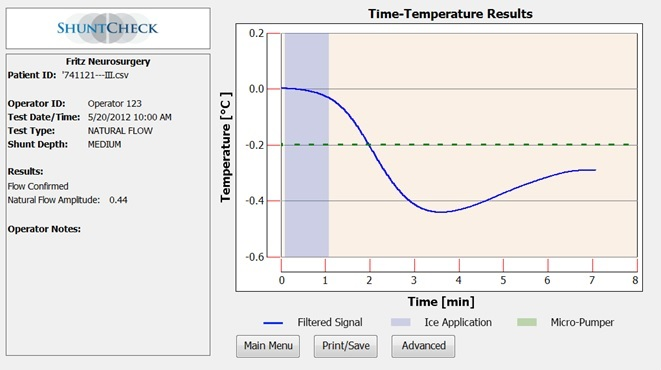
ShuntCheck Results Screen

Early clinical testing of ShuntCheck found that functioning shunts flow intermittently, which meant that a ShuntCheck reading of “Flow NOT Confirmed” did not necessarily indicate a shunt problem. This discovery led to the development of the ShuntCheck Micro-Pumper, a handheld device which vibrates the shunt valve, generating a temporary increase in flow through patent, but not through obstructed, shunts. Micro-Pumper allows ShuntCheck to differentiate between temporarily non-flowing patent shunts and obstructed shunts.

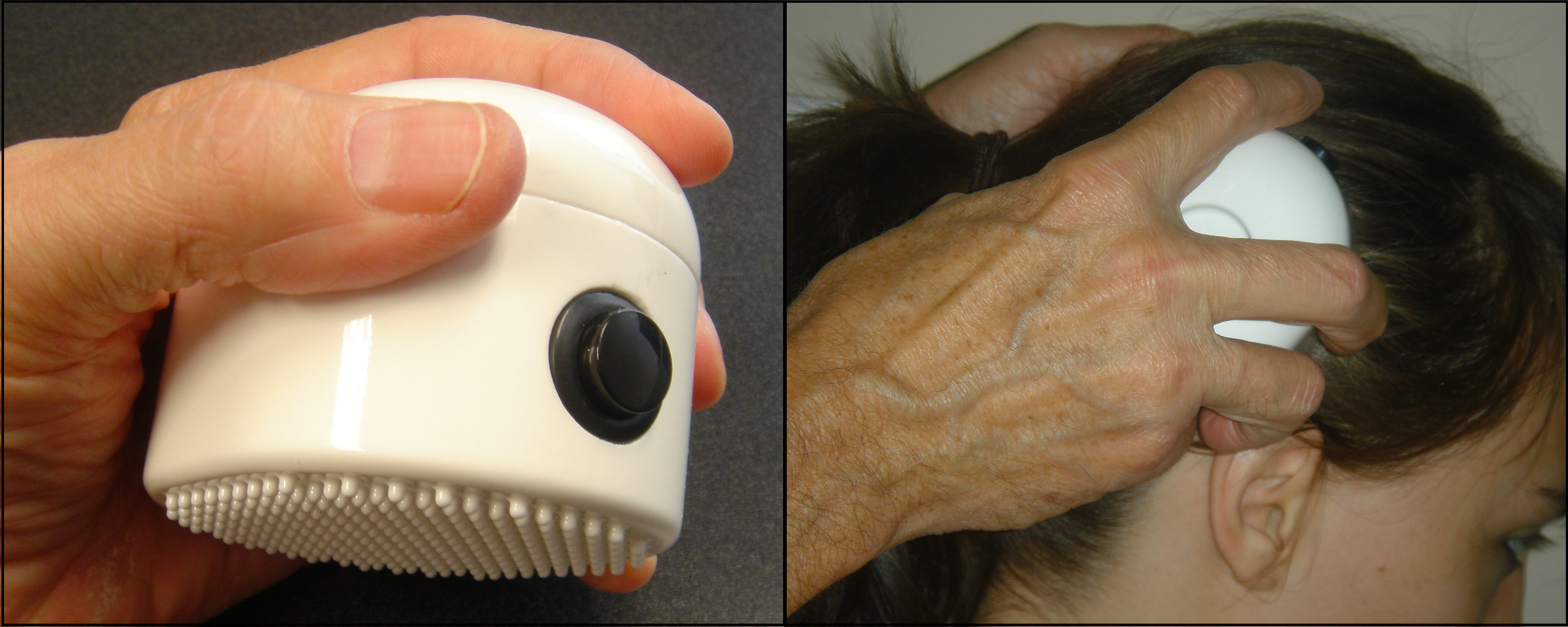
Micro-Pumper

== ShuntCheck III ==
The current version of ShuntCheck was developed in 2011-2012 funded by grants from the National Institute of Health and was cleared by the US FDA in 2013. The ShuntCheck system includes the ShuntCheck Sensor, a skin marker, an Instant Cold Pack, a Data Acquisition Unit (an analog-to-digital converter called the “DAQ”), a Windows 7 or Windows 8 laptop or tablet computer running ShuntCheck software and the Micro-Pumper.

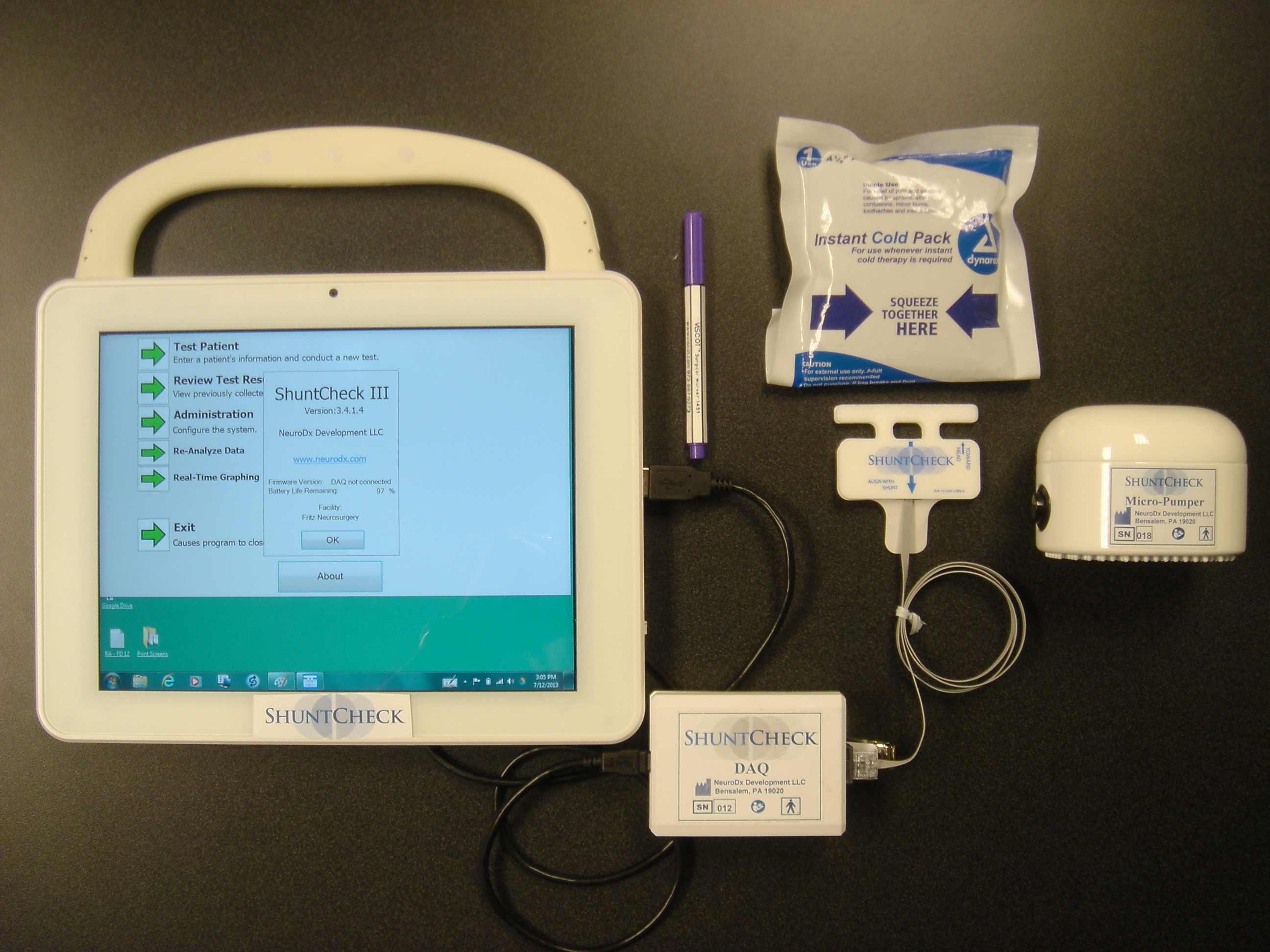
ShuntCheck System

== ShuntCheck clinical studies ==
Boston Children's Hospital 2008-2009 Joseph R. Madsen MD tested 100 symptomatic and asymptomatic pediatric hydrocephalus patients using an earlier version of ShuntCheck during 2008–2009. His key findings, reported in Neurosurgery were

- The ShuntCheck test is sensitive and specific for detecting shunt flow
- But failure to detect flow does not predict the need for surgery

University of South Florida 2008 Arthur E. Marlin MD and Sarah J Gaskill MD conducted ShuntCheck testing on 35 asymptomatic pediatric patients with similar results.

These findings led to the development of the Micro-Pumper.

Boston Children's Hospital 2010-2013 Dr. Madsen is testing 130 symptomatic and asymptomatic pediatric hydrocephalus patients to assess the diagnostic accuracy and clinical utility of the newer version of ShuntCheck including Micro-Pumper. This study was funded by the NIH.

Multi-Center Pediatric Outcomes Study 2013-2014 Boston Children's Hospital, Children's Hospital of Philadelphia, Johns Hopkins Hospital, Cleveland Clinic, University of Chicago Comer Children's Hospital, LeBonheur Children's Hospital and University of Texas Houston Children's Memorial Hermann Hospital will conduct an outcomes study of 400 symptomatic pediatric hydrocephalus patients during 2013–2014. In this NIH funded study, ShuntCheck results and the results of standard of care diagnostic tests will be compared to clinical outcome (shunt obstruction confirmed by surgery vs no-obstruction). This study seeks to demonstrate that

- ShuntCheck is synergistic with imaging. Specifically that ShuntCheck plus imaging yield higher positive and negative predictive values than imaging alone.
- ShuntCheck is comparable to imaging in ruling out shunt obstruction in cases which the Attending Physician judges to be “unlikely to require shunt surgery”.

Sinai Baltimore NPH Study 2012-2014 Michael A. Williams MD is conducting ShuntCheck testing on adult hydrocephalus patients undergoing radionuclide shunt patency testing. This study, funded by the NIH, seeks to demonstrate that ShuntCheck results match radionuclide results.

== Potential clinical uses of ShuntCheck ==
1. A test for assessing shunt function in symptomatic hydrocephalus patients. ShuntCheck flow data, used in conjunction with other diagnostic test results and with physician judgment, can aid in ruling in or ruling out shunt obstruction.
2. A tool for establishing “normal” CSF flow patterns in asymptomatic patients. Establishing baseline flow may increase the value of flow information in symptomatic patients.
3. A tool to streamline the process of adjusting shunt valve settings to accommodate individual needs for CSF drainage. While the settings for these valves in each patient must currently be determined empirically over a number of weeks, Shuntcheck will be helpful in measuring changes in CSF flow due to changes in the valve setting.
4. A tool for assessing suspected over-drainage. CSF flow data will allow neurosurgeons to identify periods and causes of high CSF flow when assessing suspected CSF over drainage. This data can also be used to evaluate flow and siphon control devices to determine if they are meeting the patient's needs.
5. A post operative test to confirm shunt function. Hospitals in sparsely populated areas often conduct post-surgical CT scans to confirm shunt function before releasing patients for the long drive home. CSF flow data can confirm shunt function more quickly than CT (which requires time for the ventricles to stabilize).

== NeuroDx Development ==
NeuroDx Development ^{[10]} (NeuroDx) is an early commercial stage medical device company founded in 2008 by Fred Fritz (CEO), a serial life sciences entrepreneur, and Dr. Marek Swoboda (Chief Scientific Officer), a biosensor engineer, to address important unmet needs in the hydrocephalus market. The company has developed two thermal dilution technologies for assessing shunt function in hydrocephalus patients, ShuntCheck-Micro-Pumper, an eight-minute test of CSF shunt flow, and Continuous Real Time (CRT) ShuntCheck, which uses thermal dilution to monitor changes in shunt flow over longer time periods. The company's follow-on products, an implantable intracranial pressure monitoring device and a non-invasive monitor of intracranial pressure, are in proof of concept development.
