= EVD =

EVD may refer to:

- Ebola virus disease
- Eigenvalue decomposition
- Enhanced Versatile Disc
- English Version for the Deaf, a Bible translation
- External ventricular drain
- Extreme value distribution
- Electronic visual display
- Erich von Däniken (1935–2026), Swiss writer
