= Salomón Hakim =

Colombian neurosurgeon (1922–2011)

Salomón Hakim Dow
- Born: 4 June 1922; Barranquilla, Atlántico, Colombia
- Died: 5 May 2011 (aged 88); Bogotá, D.C., Colombia
- Education: National University of Colombia
- Occupation: Neurosurgeon
- Known for: Inventor of valve to treat normal pressure hydrocephalus and pioneer in the field of neurohydrodynamics.
- Spouse: Yvette Daccach
- Children: Carlos Hakim Daccach; Fernando Hakim Daccach; Rodolfo Hakim Daccach; María Clara Hakim Daccach

Salomón Hakim Dow (4 June 1922 – 5 May 2011) was a Colombian neurosurgeon, researcher, and inventor. A descendant of Lebanese immigrants, he is known for his work on neurosurgery and for the precursor of the modern valve treatment for hydrocephalus.

== Early life ==
Although his parents wanted him to learn how to play any musical instrument, Hakim also showed interest and curiosity for science in his early childhood, especially physics and electricity. It is said that he locked himself in his room to make electric circuits and build radios at the age of 12. He finished high school at Colegio Mayor de San Bartolomé, in Bogotá, Colombia.

At 22 years of age, Hakim started medical school at Universidad Nacional in Bogotá, but his passion for electricity continued and led him to perform research in electrical output during digestion, the effects of low voltage on womb contraction, and the calcium formation stimulation by electrolysis. He later travelled to the United States to continue his medical studies in Neurosurgery in 1950, and Neuropathology in 1954.

== Career and normal-pressure hydrocephalus ==
During his Research fellowship, Dr. Hakim performed autopsies of Alzheimer Disease patients and with other degenerative diseases of the central nervous system (CNS). He noted that the majority of the cases their brain ventricles were enlarged without destruction of the brain cortex. However, nobody was able to explain the reason why, which led Hakim's curiosity to research more back in Colombia. In 1957, he finally realized that these patients had what is now known as normal pressure hydrocephalus (NPH) after finding a 16-year-old live patient with this condition. He published his work in 1964 and called Dr. Raymond Adams to share his discovery, but Adams rejected his idea. Months later, a US consular employee in Colombia suffering from the same condition came to his practice. Hakim proposed to treat him by taking some cerebrospinal fluid (CSF) as he had treated the young patient. But skeptically, the family rejected it and wanted to go back to the United States for treatment. Hakim, convinced that nobody would be able to treat her there, decided to fly with them. At the Massachusetts General Hospital, he treated the patient, who had a sudden incredible improvement. After seeing this, Dr. Adams got interested in Hakim's work and published Dr. Hakim's discovery, taking some of the credit for this amazing finding. This concept of NPH opened the door to other research including the treatment of dementia in the elderly. Hakim continued working on NPH and for many years he has researched the mechanics of the intracranial cavity and CSF.

=== Unidirectional valve ===
The first valve to treat hydrocephalus was introduced in 1949 by Spitz, but this valve had several disadvantages which sometimes risked the patient's life. Knowing this and working in his home shop in Bogotá, Hakim improved and developed a unidirectional valve with the capacity to regulate the CSF pressure by adding a spring pressure control in a stainless steel cone and synthetic ruby ball. This valve was much safer, and it was introduced to the medical community in 1966. Despite all medical advances, all modern valves are built based on his invention. He holds more than 28 United States patents for his various inventions. Nowadays, following his father steps, Carlos, Hakim's eldest son, has continued his father's research in neurosurgery and engineering. Carlos, with the collaboration of his father, has recently developed a programmable and adjustable (through the skin) valve which may prevent ventricular collapse when the pressure of the CSF is too low. Today, the valve is marketed under the name Codman Hakim valve, acquired by Integra LifeSciences in 2017.

== Other achievements and legacy ==
Hakim's findings and inventions brought him global recognition. He has been invited and has given lectures in more than 85 Neurosurgery conferences around the planet in 33 different countries, in Europe (specially England and France), Asia (Hong Kong, South Korea and Middle East countries) as well as the whole American continent. He held 45 English publications (7 of them in the New England Journal) to complete 70 in other languages. He also worked as a professor for Universidad de los Andes, Universidad Nacional de Colombia, and La Universidad Javeriana in Colombia as well as being the director of the Neurosurgeon Department in the Military Hospital in Bogotá. In 2010, Dr Hakim got an award from the Hydrocephalus Association in its annual conference in Cleveland, the Lifetime Achievement award, for his extense contribution to the treatment and understanding of the CSF circulation and its anomalies. Nowadays, NPH is also called as "Hakim Syndrome" in honor of his accomplishments. Today, 9 to 14% of elderly living in any type of assisted facility suffered from NPH. However, and despite the fact that this disorder was discovered in the late 1950s, and published in the mid 1960s, much more remains unknown, and NPH is sometimes misdiagnosed. However, thanks to Dr. Hakim, the curiosity of many researches in the world is awakened, which results in many publications about NPH.

== Death ==
Hakim died surrounded by his family in a Foundation Santa Fe Hospital in Bogota due to a hemorrhagic stroke.
