= Normal pressure hydrocephalus =

Buildup of cerebrospinal fluid in the brain

Normal-pressure hydrocephalus
- Other names: Malresorptive hydrocephalus
- Specialty: Neurology

Normal pressure hydrocephalus (NPH), also called malresorptive hydrocephalus, is a form of communicating hydrocephalus in which excess cerebrospinal fluid (CSF) builds up in the ventricles, leading to normal or slightly elevated cerebrospinal fluid pressure. The fluid build-up causes the ventricles to enlarge and the pressure inside the head to increase, compressing surrounding brain tissue and leading to neurological complications. Although the cause of idiopathic (also referred to as primary) NPH remains unclear, it has been associated with various co-morbidities including hypertension, diabetes mellitus, Alzheimer's disease, and hyperlipidemia. Causes of secondary NPH include trauma, hemorrhage, or infection. The disease presents in a classic triad of symptoms, which are memory impairment, urinary frequency, and balance problems/gait deviations (note: use of this triad as the diagnostic method is obsolete; the triad symptoms appear at a relatively late stage, and each of the three can be caused by a number of other conditions). The disease was first described by Salomón Hakim and Raymond Adams in 1965.

The usual treatment is surgical placement of a ventriculoperitoneal shunt to drain excess CSF into the lining of the abdomen where the CSF will eventually be absorbed. An alternate, less invasive treatment is endoscopic third ventriculostomy. NPH is often misdiagnosed as other conditions including Meniere's disease (due to balance problems), Parkinson's disease (due to gait) or Alzheimer's disease (due to cognitive dysfunction).

== Signs and symptoms ==
NPH exhibits a classic triad of clinical findings (known as the Adams triad or Hakim's triad). The triad consists of walking difficulty, reduced attention span, and urinary frequency or incontinence. Symptoms present insidiously over the course of 3–6 months. The triad is considered obsolete for diagnostic purposes and newer guidelines are available.

Gait deviations/balance problems are present in nearly all NPH patients and are typically the first presenting symptom. This is caused by expansion of the lateral ventricles, which can impinge on the corticospinal tract motor fibers. The typical gait abnormality in NPH is a broad-based, slow, short-stepped, "stuck to the floor", or "magnetic" movement. The gait abnormalities in NPH may bear resemblance to a gait associated with Parkinson's disease. The gait deviation can be classified as mild, marked, or severe: "marked" is when the patient has difficulty walking because of considerable instability; "severe" is when it is not possible for the patient to walk without aids (such as a cane or a wheeled walker). An associated tremor of the hands, legs, or feet can be seen in up to 40% of NPH patients.

Dementia presents as progressive cognitive impairment which is present in 60% of patients at time of treatment. This is caused by distortions predominantly at the frontal lobe and the subcortex. Initial deficits involve planning, organization, attention, and concentration. Further deficits include difficulty managing finances, taking medications, driving, keeping track of appointments, daytime sleeping, short-term memory impairments, and psychomotor slowing. Late-stage features include apathy, reduced drive, slowed thinking, and reduced speech.

Urinary incontinence appears late in the illness and is present in 50% of patients at time of treatment. Urinary dysfunction begins as increased frequency often at night and progresses to urge incontinence and permanent incontinence.

== Pathogenesis ==
Every day, the body makes roughly 600–700 ml of CSF, and about the same amount is reabsorbed into the bloodstream. Hydrocephalus is caused by an imbalance between the amount of fluid produced and its absorption rate. Enlarged ventricles put increased pressure on the adjacent cortical tissue and cause myriad effects in the patient, including distortion of the fibers in the corona radiata. This leads to an increase in intracranial pressure (ICP). The ICP gradually falls but remains slightly elevated, and the CSF pressure reaches a high normal level of 15 to 20 cm H_{2}O. Measurements of ICP, therefore, are not usually elevated. Because of this, patients do not exhibit the classic signs that accompany increased intracranial pressure such as headache, nausea, vomiting, or altered consciousness, although some studies have shown pressure elevations to occur intermittently.

The exact pathogenesis is unknown, but consensus on some mechanisms include:

- An imbalance exists between production and resorption of CSF.
- The resistance to CSF outflow is often elevated.
- The disease is not caused by overproduction of CSF or obstruction of CSF flow at the ventricles.

The syndrome is often divided into two groups, primary (also called idiopathic) and secondary, based on cause. The underlying etiology of primary NPH has not yet been identified. Primary NPH affects adults age 40 years or older, most commonly in adults over 60. Secondary NPH can affect persons of any age and occurs due to conditions such as subarachnoid hemorrhage, meningitis, brain surgery, brain radiation, or traumatic brain injury. These conditions are thought to lead to increased inflammation of the arachnoid granulations, which further leads to decreased CSF reabsorption and therefore enlargement of ventricles.

Symptoms of gait deviation, neurological impairment, and urinary incontinence seen in NPH are due to compression of the corresponding regions of the brain that control these functions. Gait abnormalities are thought to be due to compression of the corticospinal tract fibers in the corona radiata that coordinate motor movements of the legs. Compression of the brainstem as well as poor perfusion of the periventricular white matter in the prefrontal cortex are also thought to contribute to gait deviations in NPH. Dementia in NPH is most likely caused by ventricular enlargement compressing the calvarium, which further leads to tearing of currently unidentified nerve fibers. Lastly, urinary incontinence is thought to be caused by stretching of the periventricular sacral fibers of the corticospinal tract fibers leading to loss of voluntary bladder contraction.

== Diagnosis ==
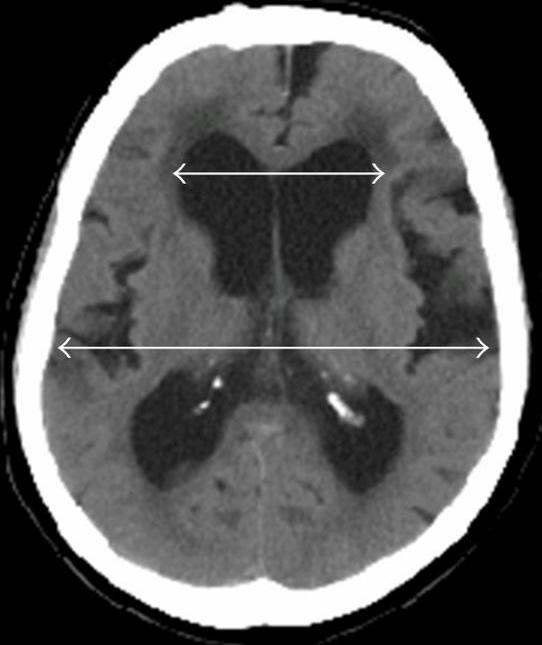
Evan's index is the ratio of maximum width of the frontal horns to the maximum width of the inner table of the cranium. An Evan's index more than 0.31 indicates hydrocephalus.

Patients with suspected idiopathic NPH should have at least one of the symptoms in Hakim's triad (gait disturbance, urinary incontinence, and cognitive impairment) in addition to ventricular enlargement on neuroimaging. An extensive and detailed patient history is required in order to exclude other diseases that may explain the patient's symptoms. Known causes of secondary NPH (head injury, meningitis, hemorrhage) should be ruled out prior to further investigation of idiopathic NPH.

The international evidenced-based diagnostic criteria for primary, or idiopathic, NPH are:

- Gradual onset after age 40 years, symptoms duration of ≥ 3–6 months, clinical evidence of gait or balance impairment, and impairment of cognition or urinary incontinence
- Imaging from magnetic resonance imaging (MRI) or computed tomography (CT) is needed to demonstrate enlarged ventricles and no macroscopic obstruction to cerebrospinal fluid flow. Imaging should show an enlargement to at least one of the temporal horns of lateral ventricles, and impingement against the falx cerebri resulting in a callosal angle ≤ 90° on the coronal view, showing evidence of altered brain water content, or normal active flow (which is referred to as "flow void") at the cerebral aqueduct and fourth ventricle.

Typical imaging findings in normal pressure hydrocephalus versus brain atrophy.
	Normal pressure hydrocephalus	Brain atrophy
Preferable projection	Coronal plane at the level of the posterior commissure of the brain.	
Modality in this example	CT	MRI
CSF spaces over the convexity near the vertex (red ellipse)	Narrowed convexity ("tight convexity") as well as medial cisterns	Widened vertex (red arrow) and medial cisterns (green arrow)
Callosal angle (blue V)	Acute angle	Obtuse angle
Most likely cause of leucoaraiosis (periventricular signal alterations, blue arrows)	Transependymal cerebrospinal fluid diapedesis	Vascular encephalopathy, in this case suggested by unilateral occurrence

MRI scans are the preferred imaging. The distinction between normal and enlarged ventricular size by cerebral atrophy is difficult to ascertain. Up to 80% of cases are unrecognized and untreated due to difficulty of diagnosis. Imaging should also reveal the absence of any cerebral mass lesions or any signs of obstructions. Although all patients with NPH have enlarged ventricles, not all elderly patients with enlarged ventricles have primary NPH. Cerebral atrophy can cause enlarged ventricles, as well, and is referred to as hydrocephalus ex vacuo. For these reasons it's utmost important to note that Evan's index although commonly used in imaging is not very specific for NPH. One recent systematic review and meta-analysis suggests that callosal angle has high diagnostic performance and is commonly used together with Evan's index.

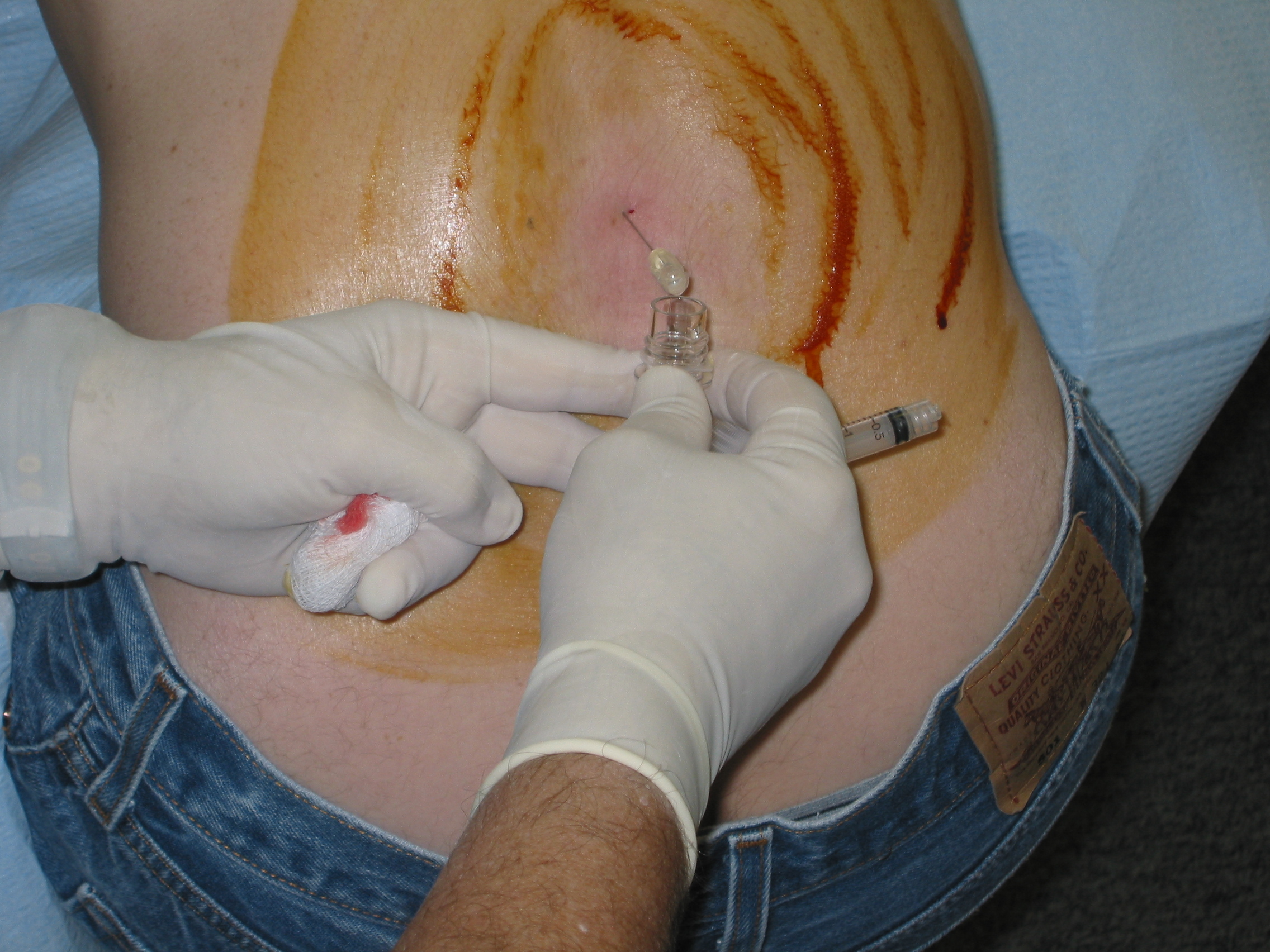
Image of patient receiving lumbar puncture (LP). Cerebrospinal fluid (CSF) obtained from an LP can be tested to aid in the diagnosis of NPH.

The Miller Fisher test involves a high-volume lumbar puncture (LP) with removal of 30–50 ml of CSF. Gait and cognitive function are typically tested just before and within 2–3 hours after the LP to assess for signs of symptomatic improvement. The CSF infusion test can also be used to aid in diagnosis of NPH. During the CSF infusion test, a ringer lactate solution is infused into a spinal needle while another spinal needle is used to record numerous CSF pressure variables including ICP, outflow resistance, and CSF formation rate. The tests have a positive predictive value over 90%, but a negative predictive value less than 50%. The LP should show normal or mildly elevated CSF pressure. CSF should have normal cell contents, glucose levels, and protein levels.

== Treatment ==
=== Ventriculoperitoneal shunts ===
Diagram demonstrating surgical placement of a VP shunt used to manage NPH

For suspected cases of NPH, CSF shunting is the first-line treatment. The most common type used to treat NPH is ventriculoperitoneal (VP) shunts, which drain CSF fluid to the peritoneal cavity. Adjustable valves allow fine-tuning of CSF drainage. NPH symptoms reportedly improve in 70–90% of patients with CSF shunt. Risk-benefit analyses have shown beyond any doubt that surgery for NPH is far better than conservative treatment or the natural course. VP shunt is less likely to be recommended in those who have severe dementia at time of NPH diagnosis, regardless of findings found on MRI or CT.

Gait symptoms improve in at least 85% of patients. Cognitive symptoms improve in up to 80%, when surgery is performed early in the disease course. Urgency and incontinence improve in up to 80% of patients, but only up to 50–60% if the shunt is implanted late in the disease course. The patients most likely to show improvement are those who show only gait deviation, mild or no incontinence, and mild dementia. The risk of adverse events related to shunt placement is 11%; this includes shunt failure, infections such as ventriculitis, shunt obstruction, over- or under-drainage, and development of a subdural hematoma.

=== Medications ===
No medications are effective for primary NPH. Lasting reductions in ICP have not been demonstrated with acetazolamide. Transient reduction in ICP after administration of an acetazolamide bolus has been shown to be a positive predictor for good response after VP shunt placement in NPH patients.

Research is currently aimed at finding other medication options for the management of NPH symptoms. Steroids have demonstrated decreased production of CSF in animal studies on healthy rabbits and dogs, however further testing is required to determine if this is an effective treatment option in humans. A trial of triamterene in adults with chronic hydrocephalus has also shown improvement of symptoms within 12 weeks, however further research is needed to support this as a non-surgical option for NPH.

== Prognosis ==
The prognosis for patients with NPH varies depending on cause, severity of symptoms, and time to diagnosis. If left untreated, symptoms of gait disturbance, cognitive impairment, and urinary incontinence may continue to worsen and ultimately lead to death. Patients with a successful VP shunt can live a typically normal life with no restrictions to activities of daily living. According to a recent study, gait imbalance appears to be the symptom that improves the most for patients after placement of a VP shunt.

== Epidemiology ==
Approximately half of all cases are primary (or idiopathic) NPH. Incidence is estimated to 0.3–3% in patients older than 60 years; the percentage rises with older age. Its prevalence is reported to be less than 1% in persons under the age of 65, and up to 3% for persons aged 65 or older. No difference in incidence is seen between men and women or amongst differing ethnicities. Among individuals with dementia, the incidence of NPH is thought to be between 2% and 6%.

== History ==
NPH was first described by neurosurgeon Salomón Hakim in 1957 at the Hospital San Juan de Dios, located in Bogotá, Colombia. Hakim was contacted by the family of a 16-year-old male patient who, after suffering from severe head trauma in a motor vehicle accident, remained semi-comatose after surgery to relieve pressure from a subdural hematoma. Hakim soon discovered ventricular enlargement on imaging of the patient, however, the patient's intracranial pressure remained within normal limits. Hakim decided to remove CSF for laboratory testing and later implanted a ventriculoatrial shunt, after which the patient showed significant improvement to Hakim's surprise. These findings were later published as a case report by Hakim in 1964 in The New England Journal of Medicine. Hakim continued to research and work with patients found to have NPH and later published his findings detailing the classic triad of gait disturbance, neurological impairment, and urinary incontinence.

== See also ==
- Low pressure hydrocephalus
