= Lumbar–peritoneal shunt =

A lumbar–peritoneal shunt is a technique to channelise the cerebrospinal fluid (CSF) from the lumbar thecal sac into the peritoneal cavity.

== Overview ==
A shunt is described as a tube, catheter or "surgically created anastomosis" and is designed to bypass or redirect bodily fluids from one point in the body to another.

Lumbar–peritoneal shunts are used in neurological disorders, in cases of chronic increased intracranial pressure to drain excess cerebrospinal fluid (CSF) from the Subarachnoid cavity associated with such conditions as hydrocephalus and Benign intracranial hypertension (BIH) also known as idiopathic intracranial hypertension (IIH) and pseudotumor cerebri (PTC), idiopathic intracranial hypertension is the preferred name for the condition.

There are various categories of medical shunts and there are two main categories of shunt used in the treatment of chronic increased intracranial pressure due to cerebrospinal fluid (CSF), they are cerebral shunts and lumbar shunts (extracranial shunts). Below is a list of the various types of the above two categories of shunts:

=== Cerebral shunts ===
- Ventriculo–peritoneal shunt (VP shunt)
- Ventriculo–atrial shunt (VA shunt)
- Ventriculo–pleural shunt (VPL shunt)

=== Lumbar shunts ===
- Lumbar–peritoneal shunt (LP shunt)
- Lumbar subcutaneous shunt (LS shunt)

== Composition of shunts ==
Each of the types of shunts listed above can be composed of a tube or catheter and various types of valves, although they can just be composed of the tubing or catheter. Below is a list of valves that are used in lumbar–peritoneal shunts (LP shunts) and Cerebral shunts (for a more detailed list of the types of valves see type of valves):

- Delta
- Medium Pressure Cylindrical
- Nulsen and Spitz
- Anti-Siphon
- Sigma

The composition of a lumbar–peritoneal shunt is dependent on the Neurosurgeon performing the operation, there are no guidelines determining what the composition of the lumbar–peritoneal shunt should be for different types of cases. The composition of the lumbar–peritoneal shunt can affect how well the patient will get on with the shunt and whether or not they may need revisions in the future, although this is not the only determining factor in whether or not a revision will be necessary.

== Placement ==
The lumbar–peritoneal shunt is inserted between two of the lumbar vertebrae of the spine into the subarachnoid space. The subarachnoid space is a spongy tissue-filled cavity that surrounds the brain and spinal cord, where cerebrospinal fluid (CSF) is contained. The shunt is placed under the skin, continues around the oblique muscles on one side of the body, and terminates at the peritoneal cavity, a cavity in the abdomen area of the body. Once in place the lumbar–peritoneal shunt is used to drain the excess cerebrospinal fluid from the brain via the subarachnoid space and transport it to the peritoneal cavity, where it is eventually absorbed by the organs and passed out of the body during urination.

The operation is performed under general anesthetic by a neurosurgeon and usually takes a couple of hours. Patients with lumbar–peritoneal shunts are left with two scars; a vertical scar down part of the lumbar of the spine, and a horizontal scar across the upper abdomen. A lumbar–peritoneal shunt is expected to remain in situ for the lifespan of the patient unless revisions or relocation of the shunt is required. In some cases the shunt has been removed completely; however, this is very rare as it is difficult to determine when a patient's condition has changed to enable them to be independent of the shunt and relapse of the condition can occur requiring the patient to undergo surgery for the placement of a shunt again.

A lumbar subcutaneous shunt (LS shunt) differs from these types of shunt in that the cerebrospinal fluid drains into the potential space immediately under the skin. A narrow tube is inserted into the subarachnoid space in the lumbar part of the back during a lumbar puncture. It is then fed under the skin to a site where it can drain fluid, usually in the flank.

== Shunt revisions ==
The revision of a shunt means to replace or make adjustments to all or part of the shunt, this also means that the location of the shunt may be changed therefore changing the category or type of shunt a patient has. For some patients with shunts, a revision or multiple revisions to the shunt may be required. This can be something minor, such as adjusting the setting on a valve to change the flow level through the valve to replacing a substantial length of the shunt, or even replacing the entire shunt or relocating the shunt route to a different part of the body. For example, it may be required for a patient with a lumbar–peritoneal shunt, if multiple revisions are required or overdrainage is occurring, to have it replaced with a ventriculo–peritoneal shunt (VP shunt).

Shunt revisions are required due to the following complications:

- Over drainage
- Under drainage
- Infection
- Blockage or obstruction
