= Arne Torkildsen =

Norwegian physician (1899–1968)

Arne Torkildsen (14 September 1899 – 7 March 1968) was a Norwegian neurosurgeon. He described the surgical technique of ventriculocisternostomy (lateral ventricle to cisterna magna; a predecessor of today's endoscopic third ventriculostomy), which is also called "Torkildsen's operation".
