= Keen's point =

Site used in neurosurgery

Keen's point is one of the ventriculostomy sites used in neurosurgery, typically in pediatrics for ventriculoperitoneal shunt placement. Keen's point is located 3 cm superior and 3 cm posterior to the helix of the ear. A burr hole or small twist drill hole is made in the skull at the Keen's point, to introduce a catheter into the lateral ventricle of brain for the purpose of obtaining or diverting cerebrospinal fluid. The procedure is done for both diagnostic and therapeutic purposes.
