= Ventriculostomy =

Surgical procedure of the brain

- ICD-9-CM: 02.2
- MeSH: D014696

Ventriculostomy is a neurosurgical procedure that involves creating a hole (stoma) within a cerebral ventricle for drainage. It is most commonly performed on those with hydrocephalus. It is done by surgically penetrating the skull, dura mater, and brain such that the ventricular system of the brain is accessed. When catheter drainage is temporary, it is commonly referred to as an external ventricular drain (EVD). When catheter drainage is permanent, it is usually referred to as a ventricular shunt. There are many catheter-based ventricular shunts that are named for where they terminate, for example, a ventriculoperitoneal shunt terminates in the peritoneal cavity, a ventriculoatrial shunt terminates within the atrium of the heart, etc. The most common entry point on the skull is called Kocher's point, which is measured 11 centimetres (4.3 in) posterior to the nasion and 2–3 centimetres (0.79–1.18 in) lateral to midline.

EVD ventriculostomy (catheter within the lateral ventricle with tip at the foramen of Monro) is done primarily to monitor the intracranial pressure as well as to drain cerebrospinal fluid (CSF), primarily, or blood to relieve pressure from the central nervous system (CNS).

Strictly speaking, "ventriculostomy" does not require the use of tubing. For example, a "third ventriculostomy" is a neurosurgical procedure that creates a hole in the floor of the third ventricle and usually has no indwelling objects. Other types of ventriculostomy include ventriculocisternostomy developed by the Norwegian doctor Arne Torkildsen.

== See also ==
- External ventricular drain – Medical device
- Keen's point – Site used in neurosurgery
- List of surgeries by type
