= Kocher's point =

Common entry point for an extraventricular drain

Kocher’s point

Kocher's point is a common entry point through the frontal bone for an intraventricular catheter to drain cerebrospinal fluid from the anterior horn of the lateral ventricle (usually the right-sided one). It is located 2.5 centimeters (1 inch) lateral to the midline (at approximately the mid-pupillary line) and approximately 11 cm posterior to the nasion, or 10 cm posterior from the glabella. During cannulation of the lateral ventricle, Kocher's point is landmarked as a point of entry, and care must be taken to be at least 1 cm anterior to the coronal suture to avoid damaging the primary motor cortex (the "motor strip"). It is most often used to remove cerebrospinal fluid for the treatment of hydrocephalus.

== See also ==
- Ventriculostomy
