= External ventricular drain =

Medical device

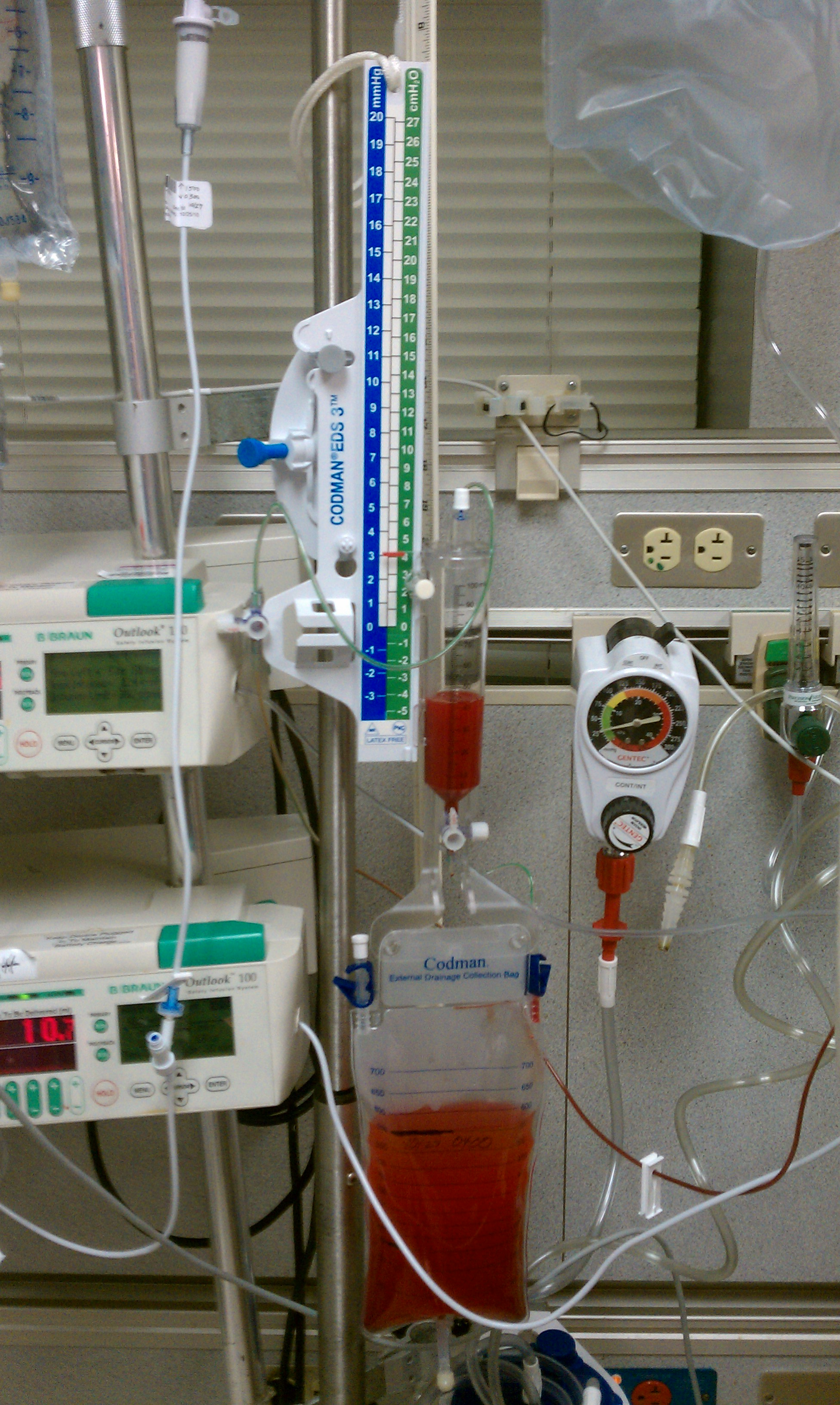
- Drainage system showing bloody CSF due to intracranial hemorrhage

An external ventricular drain (EVD), also known as a ventriculostomy or extraventricular drain, is a device used in neurosurgery to treat hydrocephalus and relieve elevated intracranial pressure when the normal flow of cerebrospinal fluid (CSF) inside the brain is obstructed. An EVD is a flexible plastic catheter placed by a neurosurgeon or neurointensivist and managed by intensive care unit (ICU) physicians and nurses. The purpose of external ventricular drainage is to divert fluid from the ventricles of the brain and allow for monitoring of intracranial pressure. An EVD must be placed in a center with full neurosurgical capabilities, because immediate neurosurgical intervention can be needed if a complication of EVD placement, such as bleeding, is encountered.

EVDs are a short-term solution to hydrocephalus, and if the underlying hydrocephalus does not eventually resolve, it may be necessary to convert the EVD to a cerebral shunt, which is a fully internalized, long-term treatment for hydrocephalus.

== EVD placement ==
The EVD catheter is most frequently placed by way of a twist-drill craniostomy placed at Kocher's point, a location in the frontal bone of the skull, with the goal of placing the catheter tip in the frontal horn of the lateral ventricle or in the third ventricle. The catheter is typically inserted on the right side of the brain, but in some cases a left-sided approach is used, and in other situations catheters are needed on both sides. EVDs can be used to monitor intracranial pressure in patients with traumatic brain injury (TBI), subarachnoid hemorrhage (SAH), intracerebral hemorrhage (ICH), or other brain abnormalities that lead to increased CSF build-up. In draining the ventricle, the EVD can also remove blood products from the ventricular spaces. This is important because blood is an irritant to brain tissue and can cause complications such as vasospasm.

== Ongoing care ==
The EVD is leveled to a common reference point that corresponds to the skull base, usually the tragus or external auditory meatus. The EVD is set to drain into a closed, graduated burette at a height corresponding to a particular pressure level, as prescribed by a healthcare professional, usually a neurosurgeon or neurointensivist. Leveling the EVD to a set pressure level is the basis for cerebrospinal fluid (CSF) drainage; hydrostatic pressure dictates CSF drainage. The fluid column pressure must be greater than the weight of the CSF in the system before drainage occurs. It is therefore important that family members and visitors understand the patient's head of bed position cannot be changed without assistance.

An example of a healthcare provider order regarding an EVD is: set EVD to drain CSF for ICP > 15 mm Hg, check and record cerebrospinal fluid drainage and intracranial pressure at least hourly. Continuous CSF drainage is associated with a higher risk of complications. The cerebral perfusion pressure (CPP) can be calculated from data obtained from the EVD and systemic blood pressure. In order to calculate the CPP the intracranial pressure and mean arterial pressure (MAP) must be available.

$CPP=MAP-ICP$

Other areas that should be monitored are: signs and symptoms of intracranial hypertension, looking for any leaks in the EVD system to prevent infection from entering the brain, and changes in the amount and color of the CSF. A sudden increase in hourly output of CSF may indicate intracranial hypertension, bloody CSF may indicate recurrent aneurysm rupture, and cloudy CSF may indicate brain infection.

== Complications ==
EVD placement is an invasive procedure. It is associated with several potential complications:

=== Bleeding ===
Bleeding can occur along the EVD insertion tract or in the several layers of the meninges that prohibit passage into the brain. If drilling or dural puncture is not successful, the surgeon may dissect away dura and create a secondary bleed known as an epidural or subdural hemorrhage. Bleeding from EVD placement can be life-threatening and can require neurosurgical intervention in some cases. The risk of hemorrhage with EVD placement is increased if the patient suffers from coagulopathy.

=== Mechanical ===
Mechanical complications from EVD placement can be categorized into:

- Malplacement

Malplacement of the EVD tube into the brain tissue instead of ventricles can occur in 10 to 40% of the cases. Therefore, computed tomography (CT), ultrasound, endoscopy, and stereotactic neuronavigation are used to minimize placement errors of EVD tubes.

- Obstruction

Obstruction/occlusion of EVD commonly due to fibrinous/clot like material or kinking of the tube. The brain can swell due to pressure build up in the ventricles and permanent brain damage can occur. Physicians or nurses may have to adjust or flush these small diameter catheters to manage medical tube obstructions and occlusions at the intensive-care bedside.

- Migration

After EVD placement, the drain is tunneled subcutaneously and secured with surgical sutures and/or surgical staples. However, it is possible for the EVD to dislodge or migrate. This will cause the tip of the drain to migrate away from its intended position and provide inaccurate ICP measurement or lead to occlusion of the drain.

=== Infection ===
The EVD is a foreign body inserted into the brain, and as such it represents a potential portal for serious infection. Historically, the rate of infections associated with EVDs has been very high, ranging from 5% to > 20%. Infections associated with EVDs can progress to become a severe form of brain infection known as ventriculitis. Protocols designed to reduce the rate of EVD infections have been successful, applying infection control 'bundle' approaches to reduce the rate of infection to well less than 1%.

=== Neurological ===
Although neurological deficits from passing the EVD catheter across the brain are uncommon, there can be an association of a patient's poor neurological status with EVD malplacement. In one report, the EVD was inserted too deeply into the fourth ventricle; the authors hypothesized that the patient's coma was due to irritation of the recticular activating system. The patient's level of consciousness improved after the EVD was adjusted.
