= Ventriculitis =

Inflammation of the ventricles in the brain

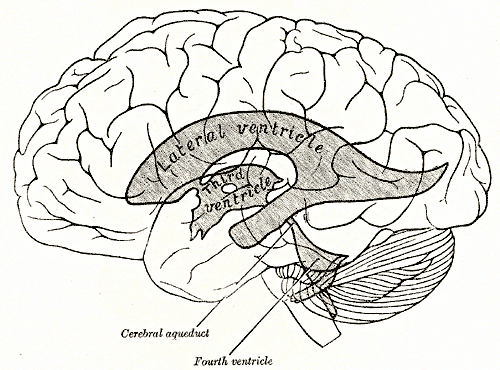
- Ventricular system (shaded) superimposed on an image of the brain depicting spatial arrangement
- Specialty: Neurology

Ventriculitis, also known as ependymitis, ventricular empyema, pyocephalus, and pyogenic ventriculitis, is the inflammation of the ventricles in the brain. The ventricles are responsible for containing and circulating cerebrospinal fluid throughout the brain. Ventriculitis is caused by infection of the ventricles, leading to swelling and inflammation. This is especially prevalent in patients with external ventricular drains and intraventricular stents. Ventriculitis can cause a wide variety of short-term symptoms and long-term side effects ranging from headaches and dizziness to unconsciousness and death if not treated early. It is treated with some appropriate combination of antibiotics in order to rid the patient of the underlying infection. Much of the current research involving ventriculitis focuses specifically around defining the disease and what causes it. This will allow for much more advancement in the subject. There is also a lot of attention being paid to possible treatments and prevention methods to help make this disease even less prevalent and dangerous.

== Signs and symptoms ==
Early	Advanced	Severe
Headaches	Nausea and Vomiting	Hydrocephalus
Neck/upper back pains	Vertigo	Brain abscess
Painful cranial pressure	Slurred speech	Temporary loss of consciousness
Dizziness	Mental Instability	Impaired mental function
Confusion	Rigors	Death

There is great deal of variety in the symptoms associated with ventriculitis. The symptoms vary based on a number of different factors including severity of inflammation, underlying cause, and the individual patient.

Patients often present with headaches, painful cranial pressure, and neck pain early in the progression of the disease. Patients with a more advanced infection have been known to complain of many neurological effects such as dizziness, vertigo, confusion, and slurred speech. Very advanced cases can lead to mental instability, nausea, vomiting, rigors, and temporary loss of consciousness. Many patients with ventriculitis also experience some degree of hydrocephalus, which is the buildup of cerebrospinal fluid due to the inability of the ventricles to reabsorb and correctly circulate the fluid. Brain abscess is another common disorder resulting from the inflammation. If left untreated, ventriculitis can lead to serious inhibition of mental function and even death.

The symptoms vary greatly, in part, because of the underlying or causing infection. While the inflammation can cause a number of effects such as those mentioned previously, the base infection could cause other symptoms that don't necessarily have to do with the ventriculitis, itself. One of the challenges doctors face in diagnosing ventriculitis is distinguishing indicative symptoms, in spite of the wide variety of possible presentations of the disease. A great deal of emphasis is being put on research into better and faster ways to diagnose ventriculitis without the delay inherent with microbiological testing of the cerebrospinal fluid.

The progression of the disease is also largely dependent on the nature of the specific case. Depending on the underlying infection, the way it entered the brain, and the type and timing of treatment, the infection may spread or withdraw on the order of months or days. Ventriculitis is a very serious condition and should be treated early to ensure as little lasting damage as possible.

== Cause ==
Ventricles
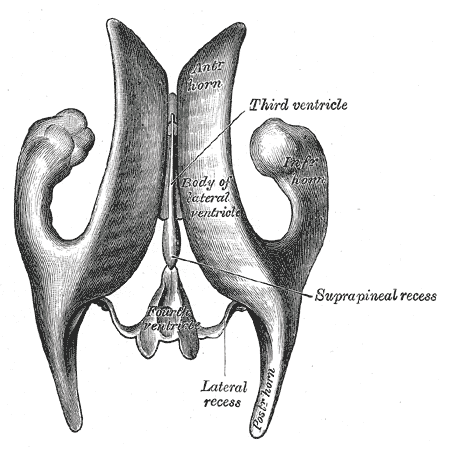
- Gray's representation of the ventricular system, as viewed from above

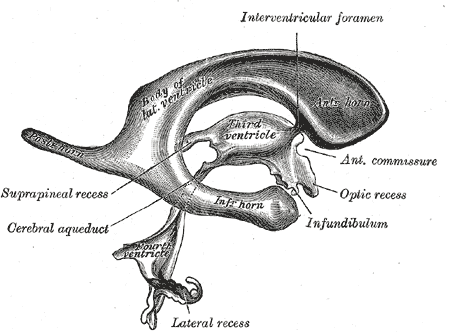
- Gray's representation of the ventricular system, as viewed from the side

Identifiers
- MeSH: D058565

Ventriculitis is caused by an infection of the ventricles, causing an immune response in the lining, which in turn, leads to inflammation. The ventriculitis, is in truth, a complication of the initial infection or abnormality. The underlying infection can come in the form of a number of different bacteria or viruses. The data seems to point to Staphylococci as the leading bacterial cause of infection leading to ventriculitis being present in about 90% of cases, but generally, what is of more concern is the way the infection entered the ventricles. The brain in its natural state is very protected from infection. The blood–brain barrier serves to keep pathogens from entering the sensitive areas of the brain. However, when those natural defenses are by-passed in the hospital setting, the brain is suddenly exposed to a host of potentially harmful bacteria and viruses.

Patients that have had invasive brain surgery or procedures are considered to be the most at risk for experiencing ventriculitis. Two procedures, in particular have been studied extensively due to their high rate of ventriculitis contractions post operation. The first group consists of patients that have had an external ventricular drain implanted to allow physicians to reduce the intracranial pressure they experience. The duration that the drain is implanted varies by necessity, however, the longer the drain is in, the more likely an infection will occur. The second group consists of patients that have an implanted intracranial stent. Both groups of patients have a much higher rate of ventriculitis than the general populace, though there is very little supporting evidence due to the lack of definition of ventriculitis as frequent misdiagnosis. Nearly 25% of patients with an external ventricular drain experience infection-based meningitis or ventriculitis.

== Diagnosis ==
Ventriculitis is commonly diagnosed using a variety of tests or procedures. When a physician suspects that a patient has ventriculitis, the first step is typically to ascertain the presence of the inflammation using computed tomography (CT) or magnetic resonance imaging (MRI) technology to "take a picture" of the brain. The scans allow physicians to check for "intraventricular debris and pus, abnormal periventricular and subependymal signal intensity, and enhancement of the ventricular lining," all of which indicate the likelihood of ventriculitis. MRIs have been reported as being highly effective and sensitive in detecting such indicators, even from an early stage.

After determining whether a patient shows signs of ventriculitis, the doctor may choose to pursue a more specific and useful diagnosis to find the cause of the ventriculitis. This is done by obtaining a sample of cerebrospinal fluid, most commonly via a procedure called a lumbar puncture or spinal tap. For patients with an implanted external ventricular drain, cerebrospinal fluid can be collected from the drain's output. After the sample of fluid is obtained, a battery of tests featuring gram staining will be performed to identify any offending pathogen or infection agent. The test will also determine any resistance the pathogen may have to antibiotics. By identifying the viral or bacterial cause of the ventriculitis, doctors are more able to effectively treat the inflammation and infection. This procedure is fairly effective, but is rarely able to isolate anaerobic organisms that may be causing the inflammation, giving cause for further research and procedural development.

Though they present with similar symptoms and often occur in tandem, meningitis and ventriculitis are two different diseases, so physicians must be able to distinguish between the two. Meningitis is the inflammation of the protective lining of the central nervous system, called meninges. Because of the similar pathologies and cause of the two types of inflammation, they are difficult to differentiate using chemical testing, but show very different visual effects in both the MRI and CT scans, hence their use as a validation that the patient does, in fact, have ventriculitis and not another, similar condition such as meningitis.

== Treatment ==
Treatment of ventriculitis is critical. If left untreated, it could lead to severe brain damage and even death in some cases. Currently, the only commonly employed treatments of ventriculitis involve an antibiotic regimen targeting the underlying infection causing the inflammation. Typically, the physician will order the patient be placed on broad-spectrum antibiotics in order to manage the symptoms and control the infection while the cerebrospinal fluid samples are analyzed. When a specific bacterial or viral cause is found, the doctor will change the treatment accordingly. There is some debate as to the most effective antibiotics and the best ways to introduce the drugs (e.g. intravenously, orally, etc.), however it is agreed that drug effectiveness is limited by the difficulty of non-invasively allowing the drugs to enter the cerebrospinal fluid. Should intracranial pressure reach unsafe levels, the patient may need to have cerebrospinal fluid drained. Implanted external ventricular drains are one of the more common ways to manage and monitor the intracranial pressure, however there are several risks involved with such an invasive procedure, including the risk of further infection.

There is a great deal of research focused around prevention of ventriculitis. It is crucial that any procedure involving exposing the brain is performed with the utmost care, as infections in the brain are very dangerous and potentially deadly. When patients undergo such procedures, they are often monitored closely over the next several days to ensure that there were no infections and any instance of even a small headache is treated very seriously. It is also necessary to monitor the intracranial pressure of the patients often enough to observe significant changes that could indicate the presence of and infection and ensuing ventriculitis. It is important not to measure the pressure too often, however, as it could in fact lead to infection.

== Current research ==
Due to the poor definition of the condition that is ventriculitis, there is still a great deal that is not known about this dangerous condition. While other, similar conditions, such as meningitis or encephalitis, have been thoroughly researched, ventriculitis is a very loose grouping of conditions characterized by the fact that the lining of the ventricles is inflamed. Because no solid definition has been accepted across the medical community, research in the subject has been slow to progress. However, most common research into ventriculitis has been focused on the main points of causation, demographic information, and effectiveness of treatments and prevention methods.

=== Causation ===
One of the key areas of research for ventriculitis is discovering and defining exactly what causes it. There are many bacterial and viral infections that could cause inflammation of the ventricles, but researchers are trying to define which are the most common pathogens, the risk levels associated with various medical operations and procedures, and why the symptoms vary so much on a case-by-case basis. Answering these questions will allow doctors to not only better understand ventriculitis, but better treat and prevent it as well.

=== Demographics ===
Currently, there is very little understanding as to who is at increased risk for ventriculitis, other than those who have undergone neurosurgery or procedures involving brain exposure. Even then, current clinical practices can't predict which patients will be affected. In order to predict which populations should be focused on, researchers must gather more case information about who is diagnosed with ventriculitis and how they present. In essence, the medical community must compile data of as many details as possible from each case so that more generalized conclusions may be drawn.

=== Treatment and prevention ===
So little is currently known about how ventriculitis should be defined and those it affects that even less can be known about prevention methods. While treatment is fairly standard for any infection to some degree, prevention is a different matter. One popular theory is the use of prophylactic antibiotics, administered during insertion of external ventricular drains or ventricular stents with the hope of preventing infection. The results of these studies have been more or less inconclusive due to a lack of standardized protocol, showing no significant benefit to using antibiotics as a preventative measure.
