= Corona radiata =

Sheet of ascending and descending axons below the cerebral cortex of the brain

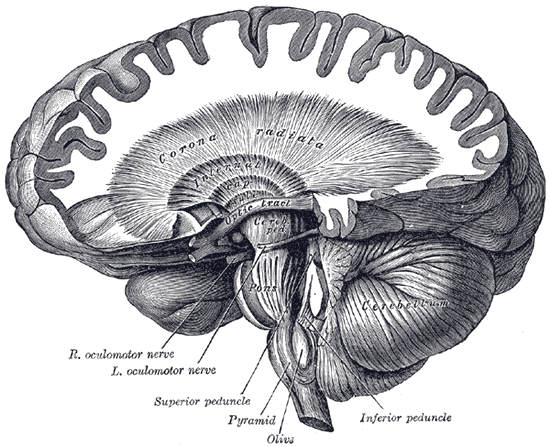
- Dissection showing the course of the cerebrospinal fibers.

Details

Identifiers
- Latin: corona radiata
- NeuroNames: 1446
- NeuroLex ID: nlx_anat_090903
- TA98: A14.1.09.550
- TA2: 5575
- FMA: 18661

In neuroanatomy, the corona radiata is a white matter sheet that continues inferiorly as the internal capsule and superiorly as the centrum semiovale. This sheet of both ascending and descending axons carries most of the neural traffic from and to the cerebral cortex. The corona radiata is associated with the corticopontine tract, the corticobulbar tract, and the corticospinal tract.

== Structure ==
Projection fibers are afferents carrying information to the cerebral cortex, and efferents carrying information away from it. The most prominent projection fibers are the corona radiata, which radiate out from the cortex and then come together in the brain stem. The projection fibers that make up the corona radiata also radiate out of the brain stem via the internal capsule. Cerebral white matter is viewed as an intricately organized system of fasciculi that facilitate the highest expression of cerebral activity.

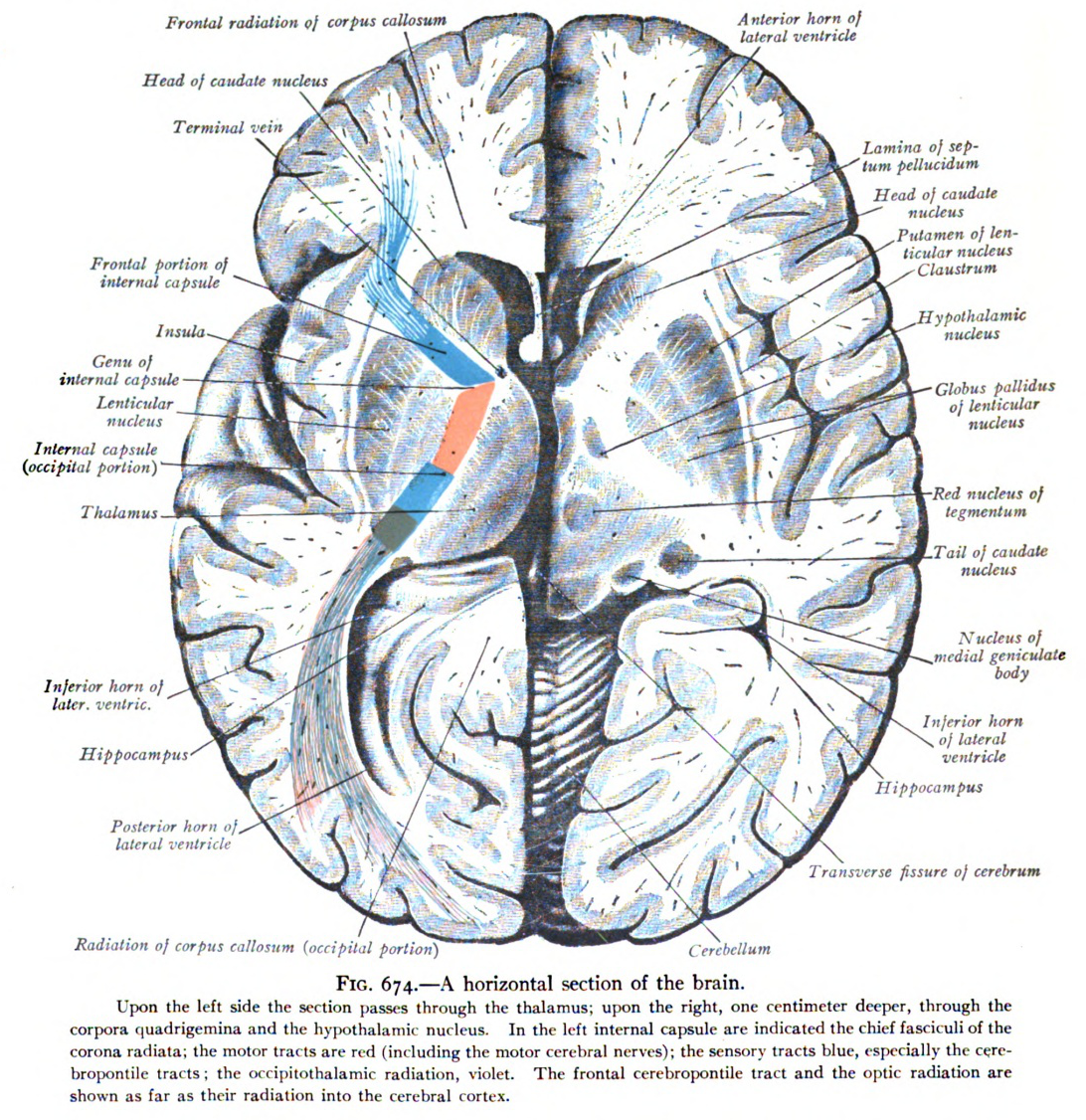
Part of corona radiata pathway in the brain

== Function ==
=== Motor pathway ===
Evidence from subcortical small infarcts suggests that motor fibers are somatotopically arranged in the human corona radiata. Following subtotal brain damage, localization of the corticofugal projection in the corona radiata and internal capsule can assist in evaluating a patient's residual motor capacity and predicting their potential for functional restitution. Data suggests that the corona radiata and superior capsular lesions may correlate with more favorable levels of functional recovery. Lesions seated inferiorly are likely to correlate with poorer levels of recovery regarding upper limb movement. Findings also suggest that motor deficit severity is likely to increase as a lesion occupies progressively more posterior regions of the internal capsule.

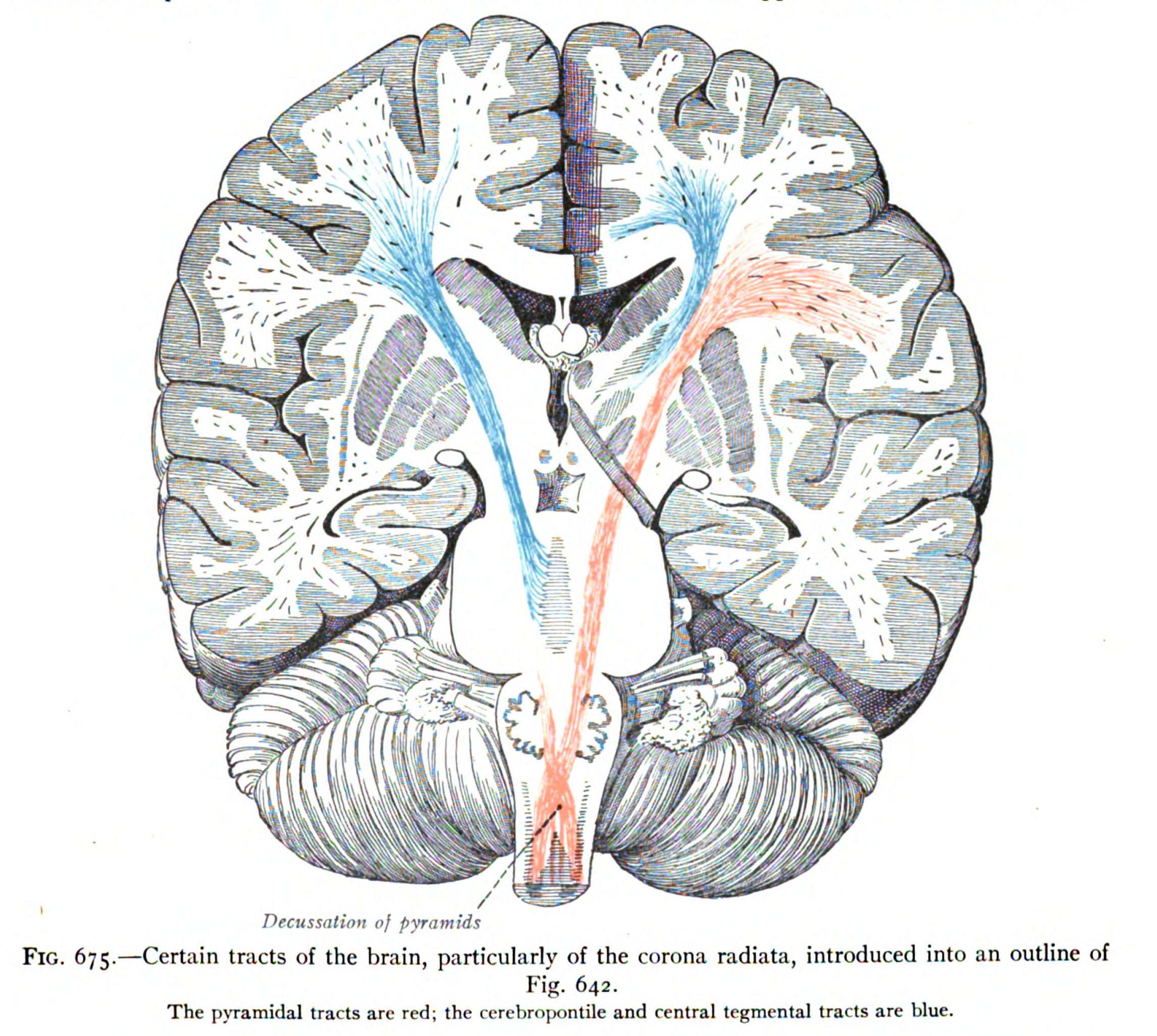

== Clinical significance ==
The corona radiata may be affected by diseases affecting the cerebral white matter, including ischemic leukoencephalopathy, multiple sclerosis, and progressive leukoencephalopathy. These may have major effects on intellectual, social, and emotional functioning.

In normal pressure hydrocephalus, expansion of the lateral ventricles causes distortion of the fibers of the corona radiata. This contributes to the urinary incontinence seen with NPH.

== Additional images ==
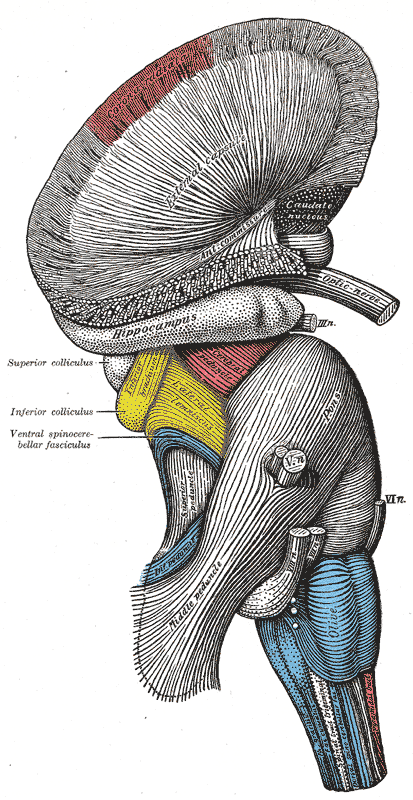
Superficial dissection of brain-stem. Lateral view.
