= Cerebral shunt =

Surgical implant to treat hydrocephalus

- A diagram of a typical brain shunt
- MeSH: D002557

A cerebral shunt, also simply known as a shunt, is a device permanently implanted inside the head and body to drain excess fluid away from the brain. They are commonly used to treat hydrocephalus, the swelling of the brain due to excess buildup of cerebrospinal fluid (CSF). If left unchecked, the excess CSF can lead to an increase in intracranial pressure (ICP), which can cause intracranial hematoma, cerebral edema, crushed brain tissue or herniation. The drainage provided by a shunt can alleviate or prevent these problems in patients with hydrocephalus or related diseases.

Shunts come in a variety of forms, but most of them consist of a valve housing connected to a catheter, the lower end of which is usually placed in the peritoneal cavity. The main differences between shunts are usually in the materials used to construct them, the types of valve (if any) used, and whether the valve is programmable or not.

== Description ==
=== Valve types ===
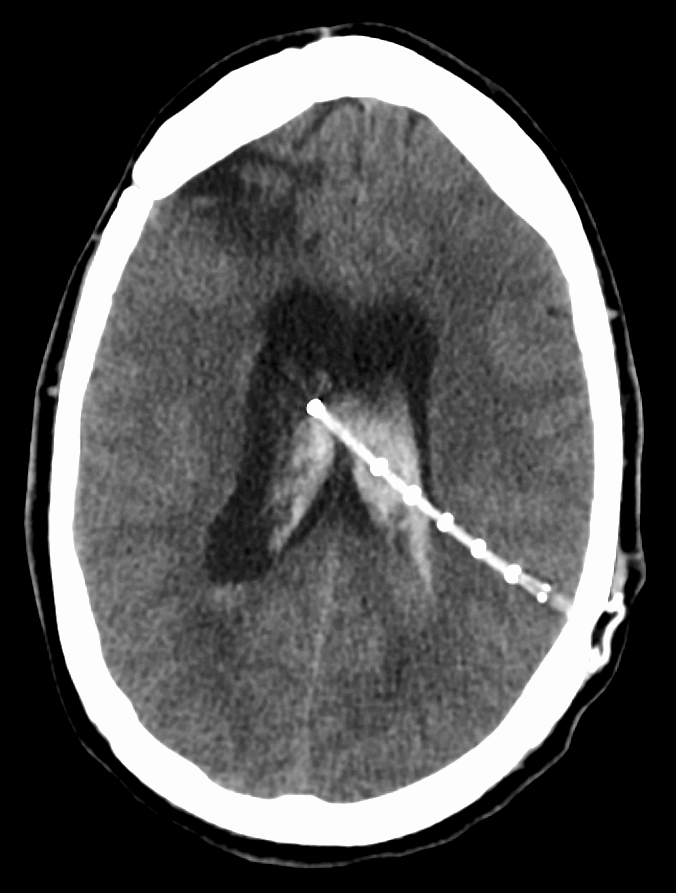
A ventriculoperitoneal shunt running from a brain ventricle to the abdominal cavity. CT scan of the head, 2016.

Valve type	Description
Delta	Designed to prevent overdrainage. Remains closed until ICP reaches a predetermined level. Leaves shunted ventricle larger than the non-shunted ventricles.
Medium pressure cylindrical	Can lead to uneven drainage of ventricles.
Nulsen and Spitz	Contains two ball-valve units connected with a spring. Does not have an adjustable pressure setting. First mass-produced valve used to treat hydrocephalus in 1956.
Spitz-Holter	Uses slits in silicone to avoid mechanical failure.
Anti-siphon	Prevents over drainage by preventing the siphon effect. The device closes when the pressure within the valve becomes negative relative to the ambient pressure. Prevents overdrainage that might occur when a patient sits, stands or rapidly changes posture.
Sigma	The Sigma valve operates on a flow-control mechanism as opposed to the pressure-control system of other valves. The device can regulate CSF flow changes without being programmed or surgically changed. The first iteration was introduced in 1987. Valve operated in three stages to prevent over and under drainage.

=== Shunt location ===
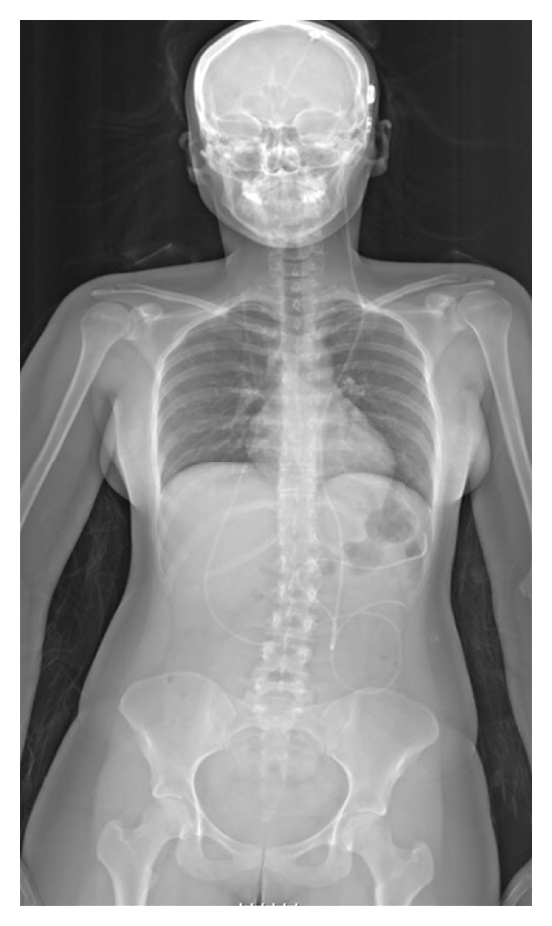
X-ray of a ventriculoperitoneal shunt

The location of the shunt is determined by the neurosurgeon based on the type and location of the blockage causing hydrocephalus. All brain ventricles are candidates for shunting. The catheter is most commonly placed in the abdomen but other locations include the heart and lungs. Shunts can often be named after the route used by the neurosurgeon. The distal end of the catheter can be located in just about any tissue with enough epithelial cells to absorb the incoming CSF. Below are some common routing plans for cerebral shunts.

==== Frazier's point ====
It is located on the parietal bone, above the lambdoid suture, 3 to 4 cm lateral to the midline and 6 cm above the inion. It is a common site for ventricular cannulation in the context of inserting a ventriculoperitoneal shunt for the treatment of hydrocephalus. It was first described by C H Frazier in 1928.

==== Shunt routing ====
Route	Location of fluid drain
Ventriculo-peritoneal shunt (VP shunt)	Peritoneal cavity
Ventriculo-atrial shunt (VA shunt)	Right atrium of the heart
Ventriculo-pleural shunt (VPL shunt)	Pleural cavity
Ventriculo-cisternal shunt (VC shunt)	Cisterna magna
Ventriculo-subgaleal shunt (SG shunt)	Subgaleal space
Lumbar-peritoneal shunt (LP shunt)	Peritoneal cavity

A subgaleal shunt is usually a temporary measure used in infants who are too small or premature to tolerate other shunt types. The surgeon forms a pocket beneath the epicranial aponeurosis (the subgaleal space) and allows CSF to drain from the ventricles, creating a fluid-filled swelling on the baby's scalp. These shunts are normally converted to VP or other shunt types once the infant is big enough.

== Indications ==
Below is a short list of known complications that can lead to hydrocephalus requiring shunting.

Diagnoses	Description	Incidence
Congenital hydrocephalus	A wide range of genetic abnormalities that could lead to hydrocephalus at birth.	0.04–0.08%
Tumor	A number of different tumors can lead to CSF blockage if they are located in certain areas. Some of these areas include the lateral or third ventricles, the posterior fossa, and intraspinal tumors. The tumors may be malignant or benign.	Unknown
Post-haemorrhagic hydrocephalus	Bleeding into the ventricles of the brain, especially in infancy, can lead to blockage of CSF drainage and cause hydrocephalus.	
Spina bifida	Specifically spina bifida myelomeningocele can cause the development of hydrocephalus because the cerebellum will block the flow of CSF in a development of Chiari Malformation II.	0.125%
Congenital aqueductal stenosis	A genetic disorder which can cause deformations of the nervous system. The defect is commonly associated with intellectual disability, abducted thumbs and spastic paraplegia.	0.003%
Craniosynostosis	Craniosynostosis occurs when the sutures of the skull close too early. The result of multiple sutures fusing before the brain stops growing is an increase in ICP leading to hydrocephalus.	0.05%
Post-meningitic hydrocephalus	The inflammation and scarring caused by meningitis can inhibit CSF absorption.	
Dandy–Walker syndrome	Patients usually present with a cystic deformity of the fourth ventricle, hypoplasia of the cerebellar vermis, and an enlarged posterior fossa. The condition is a genetically heritable disease.	0.003%
Arachnoid cyst	A defect caused when CSF forms a collection that is trapped in the arachnoid membranes. The resulting cyst can then block the normal flow of CSF from the brain resulting in hydrocephalus as well as other defects. The most common locations for an arachnoid cyst are the middle fossa and the posterior fossa. The most common symptoms are nausea and vertigo.	0.05%
Idiopathic intracranial hypertension	A rare neurological disorder affecting approximately 1 in 100,000 people, most of whom are women of child-bearing age. IIH results in a raised intracranial pressure and can lead to permanent loss of vision.	
Normal pressure hydrocephalus, also known as Hakim-Adams syndrome	Excess cerebrospinal fluid (CSF) occurs in the ventricles, and with normal or slightly elevated cerebrospinal fluid pressure	

== Complications ==
There are a number of complications associated with shunt placement. Many of these complications occur during childhood and cease once the patient has reached adulthood. Many of the complications require immediate shunt revision (the replacement or reprogramming of the already existing shunt). The common symptoms often resemble a new onset of hydrocephalus, such as headaches, nausea, vomiting, double vision, and an alteration of consciousness. This can result in damage to an individual's short-term memory. In the pediatric population, the shunt failure rate two years after implantation has been estimated to be as high as 50%. Those patients with advanced age, prolonged hospital stay, GCS score of less than 13, extra-ventricular drains in situ, or excision of brain tumors are more likely to have early shunt malfunction.

=== Infection ===
Infection is a common complication that normally affects pediatric patients because they have not yet built up immunities to a number of different diseases. Normally, the incidence of infection decreases as the patient grows older and the body gains immunity to various infectious agents. Shunt infection can occur in up to 27% of patients. Infection can lead to long term cognitive defects, neurological problems, and in some cases death. Common microbial agents for shunt infection include Staphylococcus epidermidis, Staphylococcus aureus, and Candida albicans. Further factors that can lead to shunt infection include shunt insertion at a young age (less than six months old) and the type of hydrocephalus being treated. There is no strong correlation between infection and shunt type. Though the symptoms of a shunt infection are generally similar to the symptoms seen in hydrocephalus, infection symptoms can also include fever and elevated white blood cell counts.

==== Treatment of shunt infections ====
Treatment of a CSF shunt infection generally includes removal of the shunt and placement of a temporary ventricular reservoir until the infection is resolved. There are four main methods of treating ventriculoperitoneal (VP) shunt infections: (1) antibiotics; (2) removal of infected shunt with immediate replacement; (3) externalization of shunt with eventual replacement; (4) removal of infected shunt with external ventricular drain (EVD) placement and eventual shunt re-insertion. The last method has the highest success rate at over 95%.

==== Medical treatment of shunt infection ====
Initial empiric therapy for CSF shunt infection should include broad antibiotic coverage for gram-negative aerobic bacilli including pseudomonas as well as for gram-positive organisms including Staphylococcus aureus and coagulase-negative staphylococcus, such as a combination of ceftazidime and vancomycin. Some clinicians add parenteral or intrathecal aminoglycosides to enhance pseudomonas coverage, although the efficacy of the aminoglycosides is not clear. Meropenem and aztreonam are additional antibiotic options that are effective against gram-negative bacterial infections.

==== Surgical treatment of shunt infection ====
To evaluate the benefit of surgical shunt removal or externalization followed by removal, Wong et al. compared two groups: one with medical treatment alone, and another with medical and surgical treatment simultaneously. 28 patients with infection after ventriculoperitoneal shunt implantation over an 8-year period in their neurosurgical center were studied. 17 of these patients were treated with shunt removal or externalization followed by removal in addition to IV antibiotics while the other 11 were treated with IV antibiotics only. The group receiving both surgical shunt removal and antibiotics showed lower mortality – 19% versus 42% (p = 0.231). Despite the fact that these results are not statistically significant, Wong et al. suggest managing VP shunt infections via both surgical and medical treatment.

An analysis of 17 studies published over the past 30 years regarding children with CSF shunt infections revealed that treating with both shunt removal and antibiotics successfully treated 88% of 244 infections, while antibiotic therapy alone successfully treated the CSF shunt infection in only 33% of 230 infections.

While typical surgical methods of handling VP shunt infections involve removal and reimplantation of the shunt, different types of operations have used with success in select patients. Steinbok et al. treated a case of recurrent VP shunt infections in an eczematous patient with a ventriculosubgaleal shunt for two months until the eczema healed completely. This type of shunt allowed them to avoid the area of diseased skin that acted as the source of infection. Jones et al. have treated 4 patients with non-communicating hydrocephalus who had VP shunt infections with shunt removal and third ventriculostomy. These patients were cured of the infection and have not required shunt re-insertion, thus showing the effectiveness of this procedure in these types of patients.

=== Obstruction ===
Another leading cause of shunt failure is a blockage of the shunt at either the proximal or distal end. At the proximal end, the shunt valve can become blocked due to the buildup of excess protein in the CSF. The extra protein will collect at the point of drainage and slowly clog the valve. The shunt can also become blocked at the distal end if the shunt is pulled out of the abdominal cavity (in the case of VP shunts), or from similar protein buildup. Other causes of blockage are overdrainage and slit ventricle syndrome.

=== Over drainage ===
Over drainage occurs when a shunt has not been adequately designed for the particular person. First, when the CSF drains too rapidly, extra-axial fluid collection can occur. In this condition the brain collapses on itself resulting in the collection of CSF or blood around the brain. This can cause severe brain damage by compressing the brain, and a subdural hematoma may develop. Extra-axial fluid collection can be treated in three different ways depending on the severity of the condition. Usually the shunt will be replaced or reprogrammed to release less CSF, and the fluid that has collected around the brain will be drained.

==== Chiari I malformation ====
Studies have shown that over drainage of CSF due to shunting can lead to acquired Chiari I malformation. It was previously thought that Chiari I Malformation was a result of a congenital defect but new studies have shown that overdrainage of Cysto-peritoneal shunts used to treat arachnoid cysts can lead to the development of posterior fossa overcrowding and tonsillar herniation, the latter of which is the classic definition of Chiari Malformation I. Common symptoms include major headaches, hearing loss, fatigue, muscle weakness and loss of cerebellum function.

==== Slit ventricle syndrome ====
Slit ventricle syndrome may occur, when CSF overdrains slowly over several years. Slit ventricle syndrome is an uncommon problem associated with shunted people, but results in a large number of shunt revisions. It occurs several years after shunt implantation. The most common symptoms are similar to normal shunt malfunction, with several key differences. First, the symptoms are often cyclical and will appear and then subside several times over a lifetime. Second, the symptoms can be alleviated by lying prone. In the case of shunt malfunction neither time nor postural position will affect the symptoms.

The condition is thought to occur during a period where overdrainage and brain growth occur simultaneously. In this case, the brain fills the intraventricular space, leaving the ventricles collapsed. Furthermore, the compliance of the brain will decrease, which prevents the ventricles from enlarging, thus reducing the chance for curing the syndrome. The collapsed ventricles can also block the shunt valve, leading to obstruction. Since the effects of slit ventricle syndrome are irreversible, constant care in managing the condition is needed.

==== Miyazaki syndrome ====
Rarely, overdrainage causes cervical myelopathy from neck vein congestion, which compress the cervical cord or cervical nerve roots, or impact blood circulation it is called Miyazaki syndrome. People do not have signs of overshunting, i.e. intracranial hypotension.

=== Intraventricular hemorrhage ===
An intraventricular hemorrhage can occur at any time during or after a shunt insertion or revision. Intraparenchymal hemorrhages that are multi-focal in nature have also been described in the pediatric population following ventriculoperitoneal shunting. The hemorrhage can cause an impairment in shunt function which can lead to severe neurological deficiencies. Studies have shown that intraventricular hemorrhage can occur in nearly 31% of shunt revisions.

== Outcomes and prognosis ==
Surgical wound healing for a ventriculo-peritoneal shunt (VP shunt)

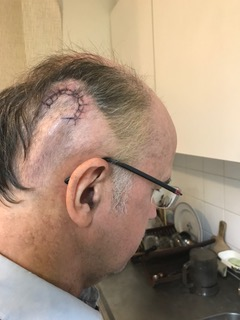
Head wound at day 6

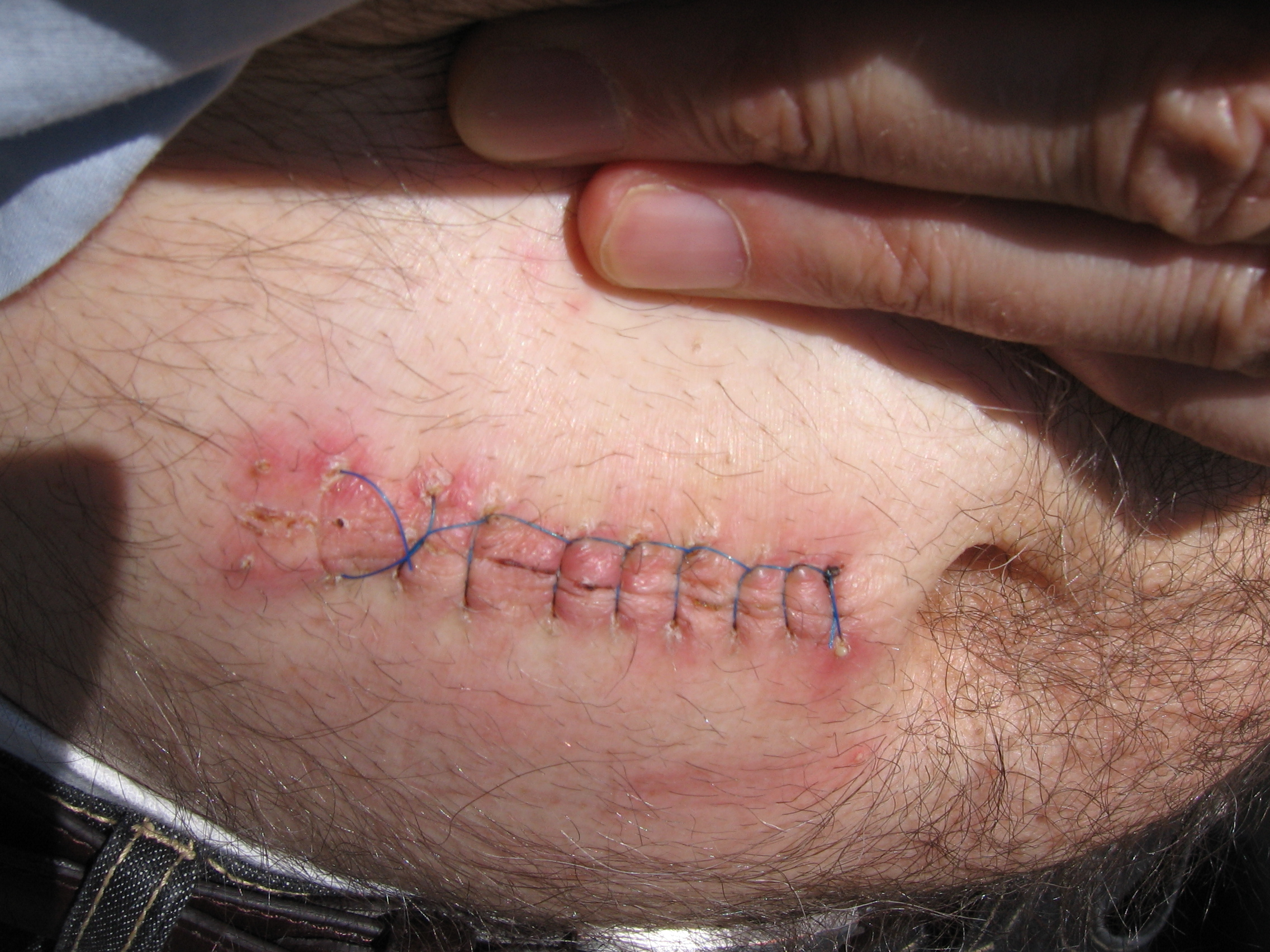
Belly wound at day 12

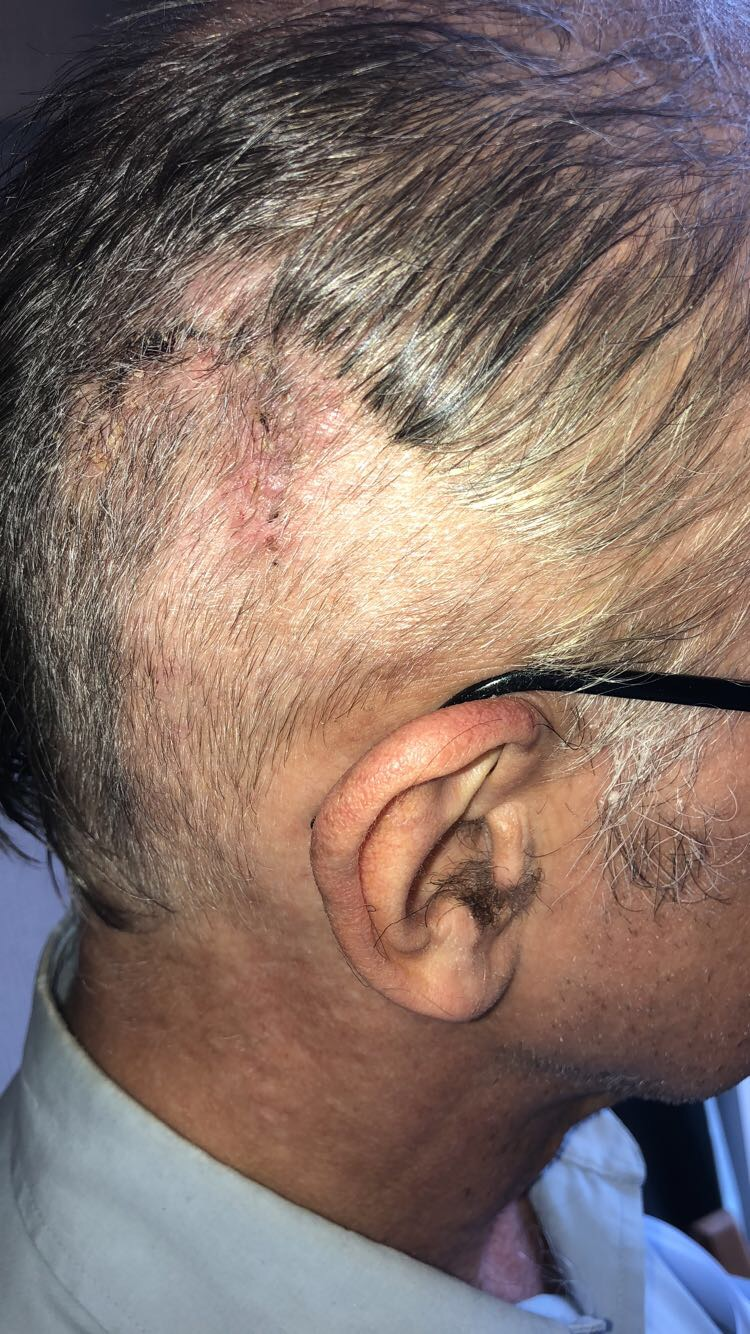
Head wound at day 15, stitches removed

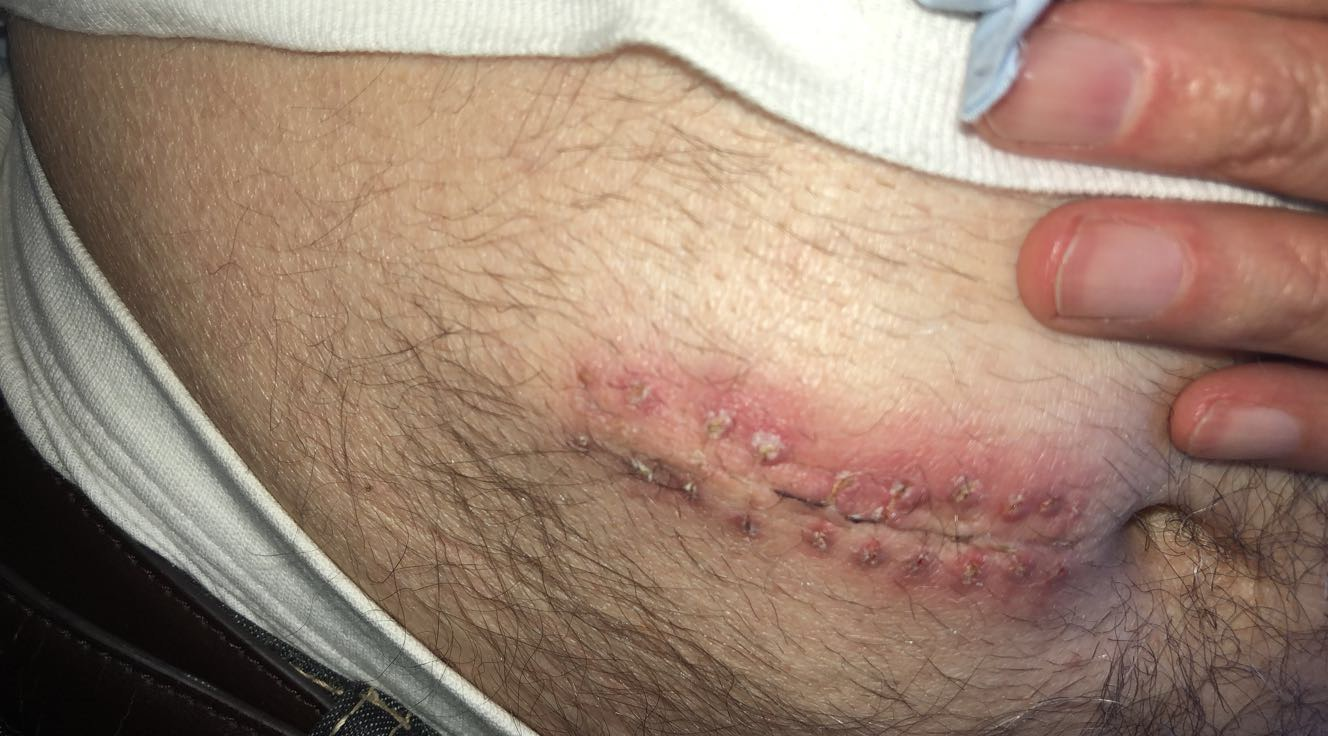
Belly wound at day 15, stitches removed

=== Shunt removal ===
Though there have been many cases of patients reaching "shunt independence", there is no general agreement among doctors on how to determine which patients might survive without a shunt. It can be very difficult to discern whether a patient could be shunt independent, except under some very specific circumstances. Overall, the permanent removal of a shunt is a rare but not unheard of procedure.

== See also ==
- External ventricular drain
- Keen's point
- Wade-Dahl-Till (WDT) valve
