= WASH complex subunit 3 =

Protein-coding gene in humans

WASHC3

Identifiers
- Aliases: WASHC3, CGI-116, CCDC53, coiled-coil domain containing 53, WASH complex subunit 3
- External IDs: MGI: 1914532; GeneCards: WASHC3

Gene location (Human)
Chr.	Chromosome 12 (human)
Band	12q23.2	Start	102,012,840 bp
Band	12q23.2	End	102,062,149 bp

Gene location (Mouse)
Chr.	Chromosome 10 (mouse)
Band	10|10 C1	Start	88,201,093 bp
Band	10|10 C1	End	88,246,158 bp
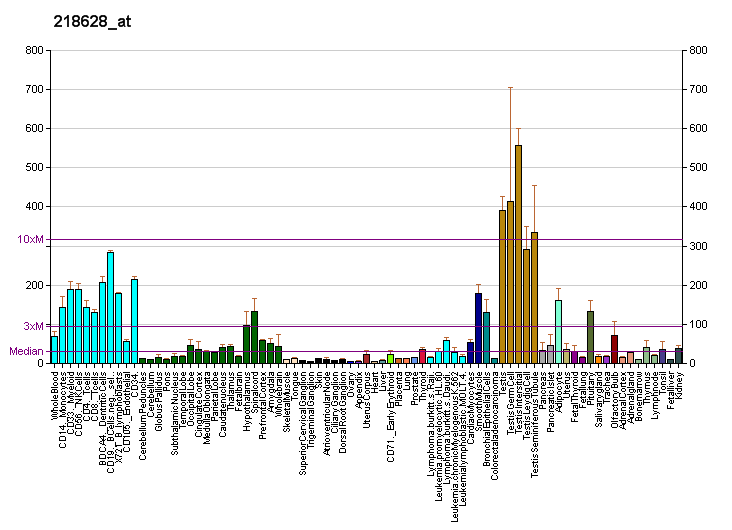
RNA expression pattern
Bgee	Human / Mouse (ortholog); Top expressed in: left testis; right testis; Achilles tendon; decidua; C1 segment; sperm; tibial arteries; left coronary artery; Descending thoracic aorta; right coronary artery / Top expressed in: lens; morula; epithelium of lens; intercostal muscle; sternocleidomastoid muscle; blastocyst; triceps brachii muscle; seminiferous tubule; umbilical cord; endocardial cushion; More reference expression data
BioGPS	More reference expression data
Gene ontology
Molecular function	protein binding
Cellular component	endosome; early endosome; WASH complex
Biological process	protein transport; biological process; exocytosis; actin filament polymerization
Sources:Amigo / QuickGO
Orthologs
Databases	NCBI: entry; OMA: entry
Species	Human	Mouse
Entrez	51019	67282
Ensembl	ENSG00000120860	ENSMUSG00000020056
UniProt	Q9Y3C0	Q9CR27
RefSeq (mRNA)	NM_001301107; NM_016053	NM_001122960; NM_026070; NM_027487
RefSeq (protein)	NP_001288036; NP_057137	NP_001116432; NP_080346; NP_081763
Location (UCSC)	Chr 12: 102.01 – 102.06 Mb	Chr 10: 88.2 – 88.25 Mb
PubMed search
- Wikidata
View/Edit Human	View/Edit Mouse

WASH complex subunit 3 is a protein that in humans is encoded by the WASHC3 gene (previously CCDC53). As its name suggests, the WASHC3 protein is part of the core of the WASH regulatory complex, together with WASH (WASHC1, WASH2P or WASH3P), WASHC2 (A or C), WASHC4, and WASHC5.. It is predicted to be involved in the transport out of the cells via exocytosis.
