= CCDC22 =

Protein-coding gene in humans

Identifiers
- Aliases: CCDC22, CXorf37, JM1, RTSC2, coiled-coil domain containing 22
- External IDs: OMIM: 300859; MGI: 1859608; GeneCards: CCDC22

Gene location (Human)
Chr.	X chromosome (human)
Band	Xp11.23	Start	49,235,470 bp
Band	Xp11.23	End	49,250,520 bp

Gene location (Mouse)
Chr.	X chromosome (mouse)
Band	X A1.1|X 3.42 cM	Start	7,460,048 bp
Band	X A1.1|X 3.42 cM	End	7,471,756 bp
RNA expression pattern
Bgee	Human / Mouse (ortholog); Top expressed in: granulocyte; monocyte; mucosa of transverse colon; apex of heart; tendon of biceps brachii; right hemisphere of cerebellum; gastrocnemius muscle; spleen; blood; parotid gland / Top expressed in: interventricular septum; Rostral migratory stream; otic vesicle; saccule; otic placode; internal carotid artery; external carotid artery; substantia nigra; fossa; condyle; More reference expression data
BioGPS	n/a
Gene ontology
Molecular function	cullin family protein binding; protein binding
Cellular component	endosome; nucleoplasm; cytosol; cellular component
Biological process	protein transport; positive regulation of I-kappaB kinase/NF-kappaB signaling; cytoplasmic sequestering of NF-kappaB; Golgi to plasma membrane transport; positive regulation of ubiquitin-dependent protein catabolic process; negative regulation of I-kappaB kinase/NF-kappaB signaling; cellular copper ion homeostasis; post-translational protein modification; protein ubiquitination; endocytic recycling
Sources:Amigo / QuickGO
Orthologs
Databases	NCBI: entry; OMA: entry
Species	Human	Mouse
Entrez	28952	54638
Ensembl	ENSG00000101997	ENSMUSG00000031143
UniProt	O60826	Q9JIG7
RefSeq (mRNA)	NM_014008	NM_138603
RefSeq (protein)	NP_054727	NP_613069
Location (UCSC)	Chr X: 49.24 – 49.25 Mb	Chr X: 7.46 – 7.47 Mb
PubMed search
- Wikidata
View/Edit Human	View/Edit Mouse

Coiled-coil domain containing 22 is a protein that in humans is encoded by the CCDC22 gene.

== Function ==
This gene encodes a protein containing a coiled-coil domain. The encoded protein functions in the regulation of NF-kB (nuclear factor kappa-light-chain-enhancer of activated B cells) by interacting with COMMD (copper metabolism Murr1 domain-containing) proteins. The mouse orthologous protein has been shown to bind copines, which are calcium-dependent, membrane-binding proteins that may function in calcium signaling. In humans, this gene has been identified as a novel candidate gene for syndromic X-linked intellectual disability.

== Clinical significance ==
Mutations in CCDC22 are associated with Ritscher-Schinzel syndrome.
