= Moshe Gaon =

Israeli businessperson

- משה גאון
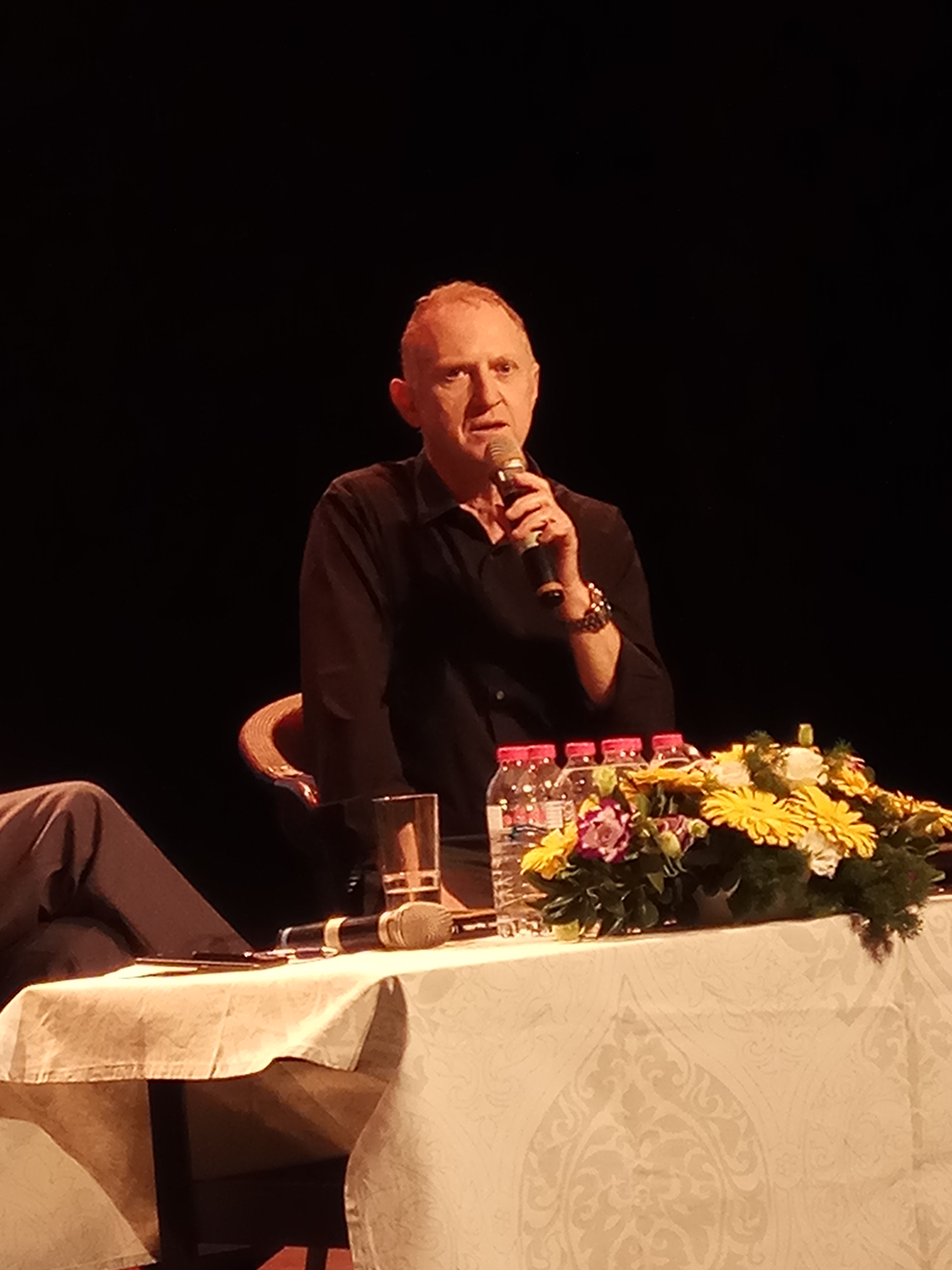
- Born: 4 July 1964; Petah Tikva, Israel
- Education: The Tel Aviv University; Northwestern University
- Occupations: Marketing and political strategic advisor
- Notable work: "Killer Instinct", the guide for the candidate and campaign manager, 2019

Moshe Gaon (Hebrew: משה גאון; born July 4, 1964) is an Israeli businessman and global political consultant. Gaon is also an entrepreneur and investor in high-tech companies.

== Biography ==
Moshe Gaon, the son of the late businessman Benny Gaon, is the second of four siblings. He was born in Petah Tikva. The family moved to Bat Yam and then the Neve Rasko neighborhood in Ramat Hasharon. He was a student at Rothberg High School. After graduation, he was drafted into the IDF and served in the elite Shaldag Unit.

In 1984, Gaon began his studies at Tel Aviv University in Political Science and Communication, graduating with honors. In 1989, he pursued a master's degree in advertising at Northwestern University in Chicago, Illinois, completing his studies in 1990.

=== Business career ===
In 1990, he began working at BBDO advertising agency in New York, managing budgets for international companies such as Pizza Hut, Federal Express, and Timberland (later acquired by Procter & Gamble). In July 1993, he returned to Israel and joined the advertising agency Baumann Ber, which later changed its name to Baumann Ber Rivnay (BBR) Saatchi & Saatchi. Gaon initially served as the head of the strategic planning unit he founded. The following year he became an equal partner in the firm, alongside Yoram Baumann, Miki Ber, and Shoni Rivnay. He was later appointed CEO, replacing Yoram Baumann who became the chairman of the group. Gaon served in this position until his father's death in May 2008.

Gaon led the team that won the tender to operate Israel's second cellular network, choosing the name and branding of the Cellcom company in 1994. Gaon worked with Cellcom for 11 more years. He was involved in marketing in the Israeli advertising industry, including establishing the industry's first planning department based on the English model; establishing the first media company, BBR-AOR, for Procter & Gamble in Israel; and introducing airtime purchasing methods after the establishment of Israel's first commercial channel, Channel 2. Gaon helped to launch Cellcom's first mobile device, the rebranding of many products and services, and the introduction of international products to Israel, such as Pampers, Head & Shoulders, and Ariel for Procter & Gamble. His clients have included Kia, Mazda, Super-Pharm, Coca-Cola, Unilever, Pelephone, HOT, Strauss and Barak 013.

In 1998, with the establishment of Gaon Holdings, he joined as a board member and served for three years as the chairman of the company's strategic committee, as well as a director and shareholder in Gaon Retail and Trade.

In 2005, he established the Idea Store, an independent division of the BBR group focusing on providing strategic consulting. That year, he founded Xtrip with Arik Braz, a company for adventure tours and self-driving trips in four-wheel drive vehicles and motorcycles around the world. In 2007, Gaon resumed his position as CEO of the Baumann Ber Rivnay Advertising Group.

In 2008, post his father's death, Gaon became Chairman of B. Gaon Holdings. In 2013, Viola Ventures bought the majority share in the holding company. A new controlling partnership was formed and Gaon resigned from the positions of chairman and board member. Later in 2017, Gaon and his sister Michal rejoined the board of directors of B. Gaon Holdings. In May 2025, Kanfei Hagai, owned by Ofer Gilboa, together with the company's CEO Guy Regev, acquired the controlling shares in the company from Viola Group. The Gaon family continues to hold shares in the company, and remains part of the controlling shareholders group.

As of 2024, Gaon is a board member of B. Gaon Holdings as well as board member in its subsidiary company 'Gaon Group' (Middle East Pipes). Gaon Group is the leader in flow infrastructures. The Group spans a broad range of business areas, including national infrastructures, municipal infrastructures, industrial and construction infrastructures. Gaon provides comprehensive, turnkey solutions from the planning stage, the construction stage, and manufacturer warranty throughout the project lifetime.

=== Political Consulting Career ===
Gaon was a strategic advisor to Ehud Barak for six years, and lead strategy, research and communications for his successful 1999 election campaign. During this campaign, his name was mentioned as a close advisor to Barak's fictitious association affair established to circumvent the party funding law. During his time in office, Gaon consulted Prime Minister Barak, and also took part in his re-election 2001 campaign, in which Ariel Sharon won.

=== Investor career ===
In addition to its investment in the above companies, Gaon has also invested in other startups and funds such Good Company Venture Fund, Catalyst Venture Fund, and the Israeli Secondary Fund (ISF).

=== Political and social activism ===
In 2016, Gaon founded yoocanfind.com, a community for people with disabilities. The site contains stories of people with disabilities from over 200 countries and allows people to share their personal experiences and connect with others. It also posts links to services and products. In 2026 the site was merged with data.Travaxy.com.

Gaon supported and contributed to the public demonstration called the "Tent Protest" in the summer of 2011.

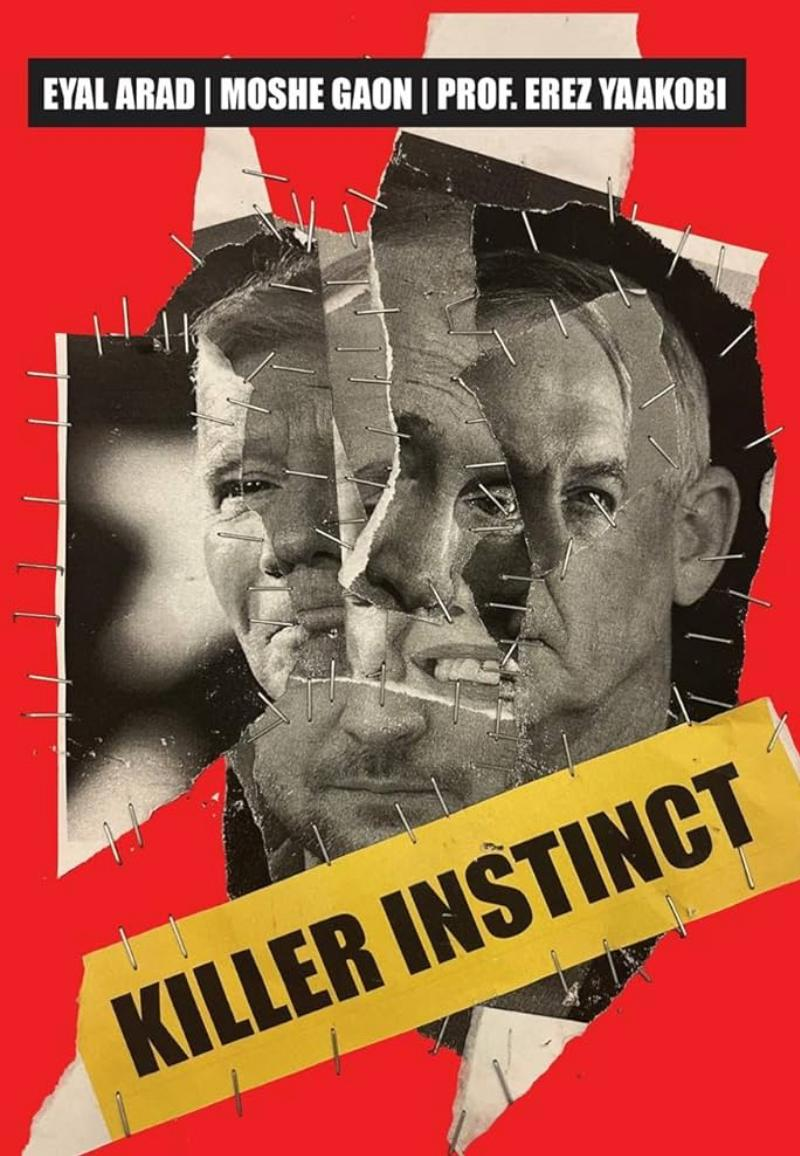
Killer Instinct, updated international edition

=== Literary career ===
In 2010, Gaon and journalist Attila Somfalvi published, "The New Zionisim", a manifesto proposing a national vision for the State of Israel based on the establishment of a national fund to reduce dependence on oil and solve the global water crisis.

In 2018, Gaon published the book 'Killer Instinct', a professional guide for political candidates and campaign managers, together with Eyal Arad and Prof. Erez Yaacoby. In 2024, his book was published in an updated version in English.

In November 2024, Gaon published the updated international edition of 'Killer Instinct', the guide to winning elections with together with Eyal Arad and Prof. Erez Yaacoby. The book is a comprehensive training book designed to serve as a resource for every candidate, campaign manager, Foreign Ministry cadet, military spokesperson, and commander—anyone who wants to expand their knowledge of leadership psychology.

== Personal life ==
Gaon is divorced and a father of four children. His brother is an ex journalist, founder of Wisdo and a known author and play writer Boaz Gaon, his brother Yoav is the co-founder of yoocanfind.com and his uncle is the famous Israeli singer and actor Yehoram Gaon. Gaon lives in Tel Aviv.
