= Dandy–Walker malformation =

Congenital malformation of the cerebellar vermis

- Other names: Dandy–Walker syndrome (DWS), Dandy–Walker complex (DWC), Dandy–Walker continuum
- T2-weighted sagittal MRI of Dandy–Walker variant (DWV) with dysplasia of the pons and cerebellar vermis in an 8-year old
- Specialty: Medical genetics
- Symptoms: Hydrocephalus: increasing head size, vomiting, excessive sleepiness, irritability, vertical gaze palsy, seizures Associated genetic conditions: congenital heart defects, eye abnormalities, intellectual disability, agenesis of the corpus callosum, skeletal abnormalities, etc.
- Complications: Shunt failure (shifting, overdrainage), subdural haematoma, infection
- Types: Dandy–Walker variant (DWV), mega cisterna magna(?)
- Causes: Ciliopathic or chromosomal genetic conditions, often not identified
- Diagnostic method: MRI, prenatal ultrasound or CT
- Differential diagnosis: Blake's pouch cyst (BPC), mega cisterna magna(?), posterior fossa arachnoid cyst
- Treatment: Cystoperitoneal shunt, ventriculoperitoneal shunt, endoscopic third ventriculostomy (ETV)
- Prognosis: 15% risk of death, mostly from hydrocephalus or its treatment
- Frequency: 1 in 25,000 to 1 in 50,000

Dandy–Walker malformation (DWM), also known as Dandy–Walker syndrome (DWS), is a rare congenital brain malformation in which the part joining the two hemispheres of the cerebellum (the cerebellar vermis) does not fully form, and the fourth ventricle and space behind the cerebellum (the posterior fossa) are enlarged with cerebrospinal fluid. Most of those affected develop hydrocephalus within the first year of life, which can present as increasing head size, vomiting, excessive sleepiness, irritability, downward deviation of the eyes and seizures. Other, less common symptoms are generally associated with comorbid genetic conditions and can include congenital heart defects, eye abnormalities, intellectual disability, congenital tumours, other brain defects such as agenesis of the corpus callosum, skeletal abnormalities, an occipital encephalocele or underdeveloped genitalia or kidneys. It is sometimes discovered in adolescents or adults due to mental health problems.

DWM is usually caused by a ciliopathic or chromosomal genetic condition, though the causative condition is only identified in around half of those diagnosed before birth and a third of those diagnosed after birth. The mechanism involves impaired cell migration and division affecting the long period of development of the cerebellar vermis. The mechanism by which hydrocephalus occurs in DWM is not yet fully understood. The condition is diagnosed by MRI or, less commonly, prenatal ultrasound. There are other malformations that can strongly resemble DWM, and disagreement exists around the criteria and classifications used for the malformation.

Treatment for most involves the implantation of a cerebral shunt in infancy. This is usually inserted in the posterior fossa, but a shunt in the lateral ventricles may be used instead or in conjunction. Endoscopic third ventriculostomy (ETV) is a less invasive option for patients older than 1 year. Posterior fossa shunts are most effective (80% of the time) but carry the highest risk of complications, while ETV is least effective but has the least risk of complications. The mortality rate is roughly 15%, mostly due to complications from hydrocephalus or its treatment, which can include subdural haematomas or infection. The prognosis after successful hydrocephalus treatment is usually good but depends on any associated condition and its symptoms. Those without hydrocephalus are treated based on any associated symptoms or condition.

The prevalence of DWM is estimated at between 1 in 25,000 to 1 in 50,000. DWM is the cause of around 4.3% of cases of congenital hydrocephalus and 2.5% of all cases of hydrocephalus. At least 21% of those with DWM have a sibling with the malformation, and at least 16% have a parent with the malformation. The malformation was first described by English surgeon John Bland-Sutton in 1887, though it was named by German psychiatrist Clemens Ernst Benda in 1954 after American neurosurgeons Walter Dandy and Arthur Earl Walker, who described it in 1914 and 1942, respectively.

== Signs and symptoms ==
=== Hydrocephalus ===
The most frequent and prominent symptoms of DWM are those associated with hydrocephalus in the postnatal period. Hydrocephalus occurs in an estimated 80% of patients with classic DWM. This usually presents within the first year of life (85% of the time), most often within the first three months. Signs of hydrocephalus in infants include increasing head size, vomiting, excessive sleepiness, irritability, downward deviation of the eyes (known as "sunsetting eyes") and seizures. In contrast to classic DWM, only around 30% of those with Dandy–Walker variant (DWV), in which the posterior fossa is not enlarged, have hydrocephalus.

=== Neurological ===
Despite the hypoplastic cerebellar vermis, just over half of individuals with DWM (between 27% and 84%) do not appear to have significant intellectual disability or developmental delay. However, many of the genetic conditions associated with DWM can present with developmental delay and other brain anomalies. Agenesis of the corpus callosum has been found in between 5% and 17% of those with DWM. This does not seem to result in intellectual disability on its own, however. Other brain abnormalities known to be sometimes associated with DWM include grey matter heterotopia, pachygyria (fewer ridges in the brain), lissencephaly (shallower ridges), polymicrogyria, holoprosencephaly and schizencephaly. Individuals with these features tend to have developmental delay or seizures. Those without any other central nervous system abnormalities tend to have normal or close-to-normal intellectual development. A 2003 review found that moderate-to-severe intellectual disability and non-DWM brain abnormalities were only present in those with the most severe cerebellar vermis malformations (less than two fissures/three lobules in the vermis), and these comprised 16% of their sample. Hydrocephalus also affected all of these patients.

In Dandy–Walker variant (DWV) and mega cisterna magna specifically, which are less severe malformations, there appears to be an increased rate of psychotic spectrum disorders such as schizophrenia, bipolar disorder, mania or catatonia.

=== Associated anomalies ===
A 2017 review found the following associations in patients with DWS (usually from an associated genetic condition or abnormality):

- 27% of patients had a congenital heart defect. These included patent ductus arteriosus, coarctation of the aorta, ventricular septal defect and atrial septal defect. In 2.7% of patients, heart failure was reported.
- 24% of patients had at least one ocular abnormality. These included cataracts, small eyes (microphthalmia), chorioretinal dysplasia/atrophy, optic nerve dysplasia/atrophy, a small cornea (microcornea) or corneal opacity (leukoma), short-sightedness (myopia) and coloboma (a hole in an eye structure).
- 16% of patients were diagnosed with a mental or behavioural disorder, with 6.4% also having a learning disability. 5.3% had either bipolar disorder or a psychotic spectrum disorder, and 2.1% had ADHD. Slightly more of these were found in Dandy–Walker variant (DWV) than in classic DWM, despite DWV being less common, at only around 20% of DWS diagnoses.
- Around 12% of patients had cancers or tumours arising from congenital genetic abnormalities. The most common were neurocutaneous melanosis (5.9%), hemangiomas (4.8%, including those with PHACE syndrome) and Wilms' tumour (4.4%). 3.2% of patients had congenital melanocytic nevi, and 2.1% had tongue hamartoma. The melanocytic tumours in these cases are thought to relate to the same genetic errors in the development of the embryonic neural tube that lead to the DWM, since the subsequent embryonic neural crest gives rise to melanocytes, among other cells.
- 10% of patients had endocrine or metabolic disorders, and 2.7% had excessive hair growth (hypertrichosis).
- 9% of patients (almost all with classic DWM) had musculoskeletal abnormalities, which included scoliosis or kyphoscoliosis and arthrogryposis.
- 5.9% of patients had underdeveloped reproductive organs, such as hypoplastic genitalia or undescended testicles (cryptorchidism).
- 5.3% of patients had underdeveloped or polycystic kidneys.

Occipital encephalocele may occur in DWM. This has generally been found at rates of 6–8%. It has been suggested to occur to compensate for the increased pressure in the posterior fossa during foetal life.

Syringomyelia occasionally occurs with DWM, though it is not certain how often. One review reported an occurrence of 4.3% in a sample. This may be due to herniation of the bottom of the cyst through the foramen magnum (a similar mechanism to Chiari malformation). Alternatively, it may be a result of hydrocephalus, in which it forms as a "fifth ventricle" due to an enlarged central canal.

Rarely, spina bifida has been found with DWM. When it is present, it is usually spina bifida occulta.

== Cause ==
Fourth ventricle (E) location shown in red, between the cerebellum and the pons (B)

DWM is caused by any disruption to embryonic development that affects the formation of the cerebellar vermis. This is usually a genetic mutation that results in impaired cell migration and division. A large number of genetic conditions can result in the anomaly. In a large portion of DWM cases, the condition is identified in the person affected, however in most cases the cause is not identified. At least 21% of those with DWM have a sibling with the malformation, and at least 16% have a parent with the malformation.

=== Ciliopathic genetic conditions ===
A genetic condition is identified in around 33% of those diagnosed with DWM after birth. In a 2017 review, 4.3% were found to have PHACE syndrome, a condition involving brain, cardiovascular and eye abnormalities, while 2.3% had Joubert syndrome, a condition involving neurological and sometimes eye and kidney abnormalities. Anywhere from 21% to 81% of those with PHACE syndrome have DWM. Other comorbid genetic conditions that were found included oculocerebrocutaneous syndrome, oral-facial-digital syndrome, Coffin–Siris syndrome, Meckel–Gruber syndrome type 7 and Kallmann syndrome, among many others. DWM has also been associated with 3C syndrome, Rubinstein–Taybi syndrome, Marden–Walker syndrome, Sheldon–Hall syndrome, Shah–Waardenburg syndrome, Fryns syndrome, Walker–Warburg syndrome, Fukuyama congenital muscular dystrophy, Ellis–Van Creveld syndrome, Fraser syndrome, Aicardi syndrome, Cornelia de Lange syndrome, Klippel–Feil syndrome and acrocallosal syndrome, among others. Craniosynostosis-Dandy-Walker malformation-hydrocephalus syndrome has also been described in a handful of cases. Many of these disorders are classified as ciliopathies, genetic disorders that affect the cellular primary cilia, thin cell projections made from microtubules that are believed to be crucial in signalling embryonic cell division and migration. DWM is one of the single largest predictors of a ciliopathic genetic disease.

Other genes that have been linked to DWM include ZIC1, ZIC4, FOXC1, FGF17, LAMC1 and NID1.

=== Chromosomal abnormalities ===
In those who are diagnosed with DWM before birth on ultrasound, up to half are found to have a chromosomal abnormality, with the most common being Edwards syndrome (trisomy 18), at roughly 26% of prenatal DWM cases. 6.5% of those diagnosed with DWM after birth also have Edwards syndrome. Other chromosomal abnormalities that can lead to DWM include triploidy, Patau syndrome (trisomy 13), trisomy 9 and partial 3q deletion or duplication. The 3q24 region contains the ZIC1 and ZIC4 genes, known to be associated with DWM.

=== External toxins ===
Warfarin use during pregnancy has been known to lead to systemic defects in the fetus, including ocular dysgenesis, microcephaly, agenesis of the corpus callosum, skeletal abnormalities and heart defects. In 1985, it was also linked to DWM.

== Pathophysiology ==
Diagram of the cerebellum, fourth ventricle and pons. The white arrow shows the foramen of Magendie (medial aperture) connecting the fourth ventricle to the cisterna magna (3). This usually remains open in DWM.

The cerebellum begins forming at the fifth week of embryonic development. It differentiates at the top of the metencephalon, while the pons (in the brainstem) differentiates at the bottom, separated by the fourth ventricle. The cerebellar hemispheres form from the rhombic lips on the forward surface of the fourth ventricle, which expand and roll over to fuse in the midline to form the cerebellar vermis by the 15th week. If this process does not complete, the cerebellar vermis will not form fully. This long period of development of the cerebellar vermis makes it particularly vulnerable to disruptions.

In DWM, the fourth ventricle opens up into and is continuous with almost the entire posterior fossa subarachnoid space.

=== Pathophysiology of hydrocephalus ===
The reason why hydrocephalus occurs in DWM is not yet fully understood. The earliest authors had put it down it to blockage or narrowing of the foramina of Magendie and Luschka, the two apertures in the fourth ventricle that allow cerebrospinal fluid (CSF) to escape into the subarachnoid space of the posterior fossa. However, later studies found that these foramina are usually open in DWM. Hydrocephalus is also usually (80% of the time) not present at birth in those with DWM.

The impairment to CSF flow may lie beyond the outlets of the fourth ventricle. Theories of abnormal development or inflammation of the arachnoid mater in the posterior fossa have been put forward. The arachnoid mater contains granulations necessary to return CSF from the subarachnoid spaces to the dural veins and circulation. Excisions of the cyst in DWM have not been able to show whether impaired arachnoid absorption is involved, since the subarachnoid space always takes days to weeks to fill up following excision.

Aqueductal stenosis (narrowing of the passage between the third and fourth ventricles) does not seem to be a factor in DWM. It is usually open, and shunts placed in the posterior fossa cyst almost always drain all above ventricles. When it is present, it may be the result of compression from a herniated vermis or cyst or an associated developmental abnormality.

It is known that once hydrocephalus has started, the compression by the posterior fossa cyst against the venous passages in the arachnoid mater is involved in the worsening pathology.

== Diagnosis ==
Dandy–Walker malformation is diagnosed based on the characteristic neuroimaging findings. It can be diagnosed prenatally on ultrasound as early as 14 weeks of gestation, although it is usually diagnosed postnatally by MRI. It is diagnosed within the first year of life 41% of the time, normally due to increasing signs of hydrocephalus, but 28% of the time it is discovered in adolescence or adulthood due to mental health problems, such as psychosis or mood disorder.

=== Criteria and classification ===
The precise diagnostic criteria and classification systems of DWM are not agreed upon, and significant dispute exists as to which terms or criteria should be used. The core criteria of DWM are hypoplasia of the cerebellar vermis and an enlarged fourth ventricle and posterior fossa (the space behind the cerebellum), though the specific degree of hypoplasia or cystic enlargement for diagnosis of DWM is not agreed upon. Additionally, there are several similar conditions which have at various times been grouped with DWM on a continuum by some authors and separated as distinct by others, further complicating diagnosis.

In 1976, Harwood-Nash and Fitz proposed the term Dandy–Walker variant (DWV) for a malformation in which the posterior fossa is not enlarged but the cerebellar vermis is hypoplastic. In 1989, Barkovich et al. proposed the term Dandy–Walker complex (DWC) to include classic DWM and DWV (under type A) plus a third malformation (under type B) in which the cerebellar vermis remains large enough to sit between the fourth ventricle and the cisterna magna beneath it, and instead it is mostly the cisterna magna that is enlarged. In this type, the hypoplasia of the cerebellar vermis does not reach past the horizontal midline of the fourth ventricle, and the posterior fossa is also not as large. The authors noted that this form would previously have been classified as simply mega–cisterna magna. In 1999, Calabró et al. first used the phrase Dandy–Walker continuum when referring to proposals that a condition known as Blake's pouch cyst falls under the umbrella of the Dandy–Walker complex proposed by Barkovich. Later authors would put these terms and systems under intense scrutiny and state that they added considerable confusion to the diagnosis of DWM. However, they remain commonly used.

In 2011, Spennato et al. came up with a set of criteria based on Klein et al. (2003) that they considered necessary for diagnosis of DWM:

- The lower portion of the cerebellar vermis is absent to varying degrees (three quarters, one half or one quarter missing).
- The posterior fossa (the space behind the cerebellum) is enlarged, and its cerebrospinal fluid flow is continuous with that of the fourth ventricle.
- The rest of the cerebellar vermis is hypoplastic and is pushed upwards and rotated forwards due to the enlarged posterior fossa.
- The cerebellar hemispheres are pushed forwards and to the side by the enlarged posterior fossa.
- The angle at the centre of the cerebellar vermis (representing the location of the fastigial nucleus) is large, giving a flattened appearance to the bottom of the vermis, or the fastigial nucleus is absent entirely.
- The confluence of sinuses, part of the drainage system located at the far rear of the occipital lobe, is elevated due to the enlarged posterior fossa. (The adjacent cerebellar tentorium is also elevated.)

Due to the inconsistency of the presence of hydrocephalus in DWM, Spennato and Klein suggested that it should not be considered a criterion for DWM. Klein's criteria differed from Spennato's mainly in that it required no apparent cerebellar hemisphere hypoplasia, but it may also have required the vermis to touch the tentorium or an absence of brainstem abnormalities.

=== Methods ===
DWM can be observed prenatally on ultrasound as early as 14 weeks of gestation, though an MRI scan is the most useful method for diagnosis. MRI can delineate the shape and extent of the malformation as well as assessing additional areas for malformations such as the cerebellar hemispheres, cerebral aqueduct or corpus callosum. Cardiac-gated phase-contrast MRI can observe the flow of cerebrospinal fluid (CSF) during systole and diastole of the heart. In true DWM, this will find a flow from the cerebral aqueduct to the posterior fossa and no flow between the cisterna magna and the space behind the cervical spinal cord.

CT may also be used if MRI is unavailable, but it provides less detail. Klein et al. (2003) suggested that a suspected diagnosis based on CT or ultrasound should not be confirmed until an MRI is performed, due to the large number of conditions that can present highly similarly and confound diagnosis.

=== Differential diagnosis ===
DWM has a large number of conditions that can present highly similarly on imaging and confound diagnosis.

==== Blake's pouch cyst ====
Blake's pouch cyst (BPC), or persistent Blake's pouch, is a condition that arises when Blake's pouch, an invagination in the fourth ventricle that ruptures at around 4 months of gestation to form the foramen of Magendie (medial aperture), fails to rupture. This can lead to a dilated fourth ventricle and subsequent hydrocephalus of all four ventricles.

In a Blake's pouch cyst, unlike in DWM:

- The cerebellum is not hypoplastic, though it may be compressed by the enlarged posterior fossa (mass effect).
- The posterior fossa is not enlarged.
- The cerebellar tentorium/confluence of sinuses is not raised.
- Hydrocephalus, when it occurs, involves all four ventricles.

Some authors, however, consider Blake's pouch cyst part of a continuum with DWM (the "Dandy–Walker continuum").

==== Mega cisterna magna ====
Mega cisterna magna is a condition in which the cisterna magna, the subarachnoid cistern below the fourth ventricle, is enlarged. It has been proposed to be due to a delayed rupture of Blake's pouch rather than a failed rupture.

In mega cisterna magna, unlike in DWM:

- The cerebellum is not usually hypoplastic.
- The fourth ventricle is of relatively normal shape.
- Hydrocephalus is uncommon.

There is debate as to whether this malformation is distinct from DWM or forms part of the "Dandy–Walker continuum".

==== Posterior fossa arachnoid cyst ====
An arachnoid cyst is a collection of cerebrospinal fluid (CSF) in the arachnoid mater. 10% of these occur in the posterior fossa.

In a posterior fossa arachnoid cyst, unlike in DWM:

- The cyst is clearly localised in a specific location separate from the fourth ventricle outlets.
- The cerebellum is not hypoplastic, though it may be compressed by the cyst (mass effect).
- The CSF flow in the cyst is not continuous with that of the fourth ventricle.
- Hydrocephalus, if it occurs, is due to the cyst pressing on the cerebellum and compressing the cerebral aqueduct or fourth ventricle outlets.

== Treatment ==
The main immediate goal of treatment is the control of hydrocephalus and the enlarged posterior fossa cyst, as these can lead to increased intracranial pressure and brain damage. A minority of those affected do not develop hydrocephalus and are treated based on any associated symptoms or condition.

=== Hydrocephalus/cyst ===
For hydrocephalus or the posterior fossa cyst, shunts are the mainstay of treatment. However, those with DWM have a higher rate of shunt-related complications than other patients with hydrocephalus (mainly due to the unconventional anatomy). One explanation for a failure of a shunt to reduce intracranial pressure in DWM has been that the cyst may herniate into the foramen magnum and form a scarring adhesion at the cervical junction, preventing it from shrinking again. If this occurs, a suboccipital decompression with duraplasty may be attempted.

In DWM, it is not agreed whether a shunt should be placed in the fourth ventricle (a cystoperitoneal shunt, or CP shunt), the lateral ventricles (a ventriculoperitoneal shunt, or VP shunt) or both, due to conflicting studies on whether the cerebral aqueduct is affected by the malformation. However, a CP shunt almost always drains both the fourth and lateral ventricles in DWM, and according to strict definitions of the malformation, the aqueduct should be assumed open, though imaging is important to confirm this. Many authors therefore recommend the CP shunt as the logical option. However, it is associated with a high rate of complications, including shifting and overdrainage. Overdrainage can lead to subdural haematomas, a tethered spinal cord, due to scarring, or downward herniation of the cerebral hemispheres. Spennato et al. therefore recommend a flow-regulating or anti-syphon valve. On the other hand, VP shunts have a lower rate of complications than CP shunts and are recommended initially by some. However, they are less effective in DWM, and the elevated position of the tentorium should be considered before installing a VP shunt.

In patients older than one year, endoscopic third ventriculostomy (ETV) may be considered as the first-line treatment. This less invasive procedure creates an artificial hole in the third ventricle to allow CSF to bypass any obstruction. It cannot be used on those with brain abnormalities such as agenesis of the corpus callosum, due to the risk of CSF escaping to other brain areas. A compressed brainstem is not a contraindication, however. ETV has a more modest success rate than shunts, as the hole often closes over. It is more likely to fail in younger patients (below one year), and its effects on the developing brain are not yet known. Cysts posterior to the cerebellum, presenting in children younger than five years, have been labeled developmental retrocerebellar cysts under a new classification in relation to the proposed neuroendoscopic management.

Previously, craniotomy of the posterior fossa and excision of the cystic membrane was used, which was often unsuccessful in preventing cyst reformation and carried a degree of mortality. This may still be reserved for patients with repeated shunt failures/infections.

=== Other ===
Treatments for any other symptoms are generally focussed on the specific condition involved and may include supported education, physical therapy or other services. Genetic counselling may be offered to parents for future conceptions.

== Prognosis ==
The prognosis is first and foremost dependent on the early and successful treatment of hydrocephalus, if present. The other significant factor affecting prognosis is the presence of a comorbid genetic condition or brain anomaly.

Mortality rates from DWM are roughly 15%. In a study of Dandy–Walker variant (DWV), a mortality rate of 12.5% was observed. The most common cause of death is complications from hydrocephalus or its treatment. Untreated hydrocephalus can lead to increased intracranial pressure and brain damage. Shunts used to treat DWM have a moderate-to-good success rate, but they have a higher-than-average failure rate, which can result in failure to reduce the intracranial pressure or infection, such as meningitis. Complications from overdrainage such as subdural haematomas are also possible and can lead to mortality. Shunts in the fourth ventricle (cystoperitoneal shunts, or CP shunts) have a generally high rate of successful cyst and ventricle size reduction, especially in the cyst (at least 80%). With a shunt in the lateral ventricles (ventriculoperitoneal shunt, or VP shunt), studies have generally found a roughly 50% successful cyst size reduction rate, with successful ventricle size reduction roughly two thirds of the time.

Other systemic or genetic conditions are often present with DWM, and each have their own significant effect on prognosis.

== Epidemiology ==
The prevalence of DWM is estimated at between 1 in 25,000 to 1 in 50,000. DWM is the cause of around 4.3% of cases of congenital hydrocephalus and 2.5% of all cases of hydrocephalus.

A 2017 review found that most patients (65%) were diagnosed with either "Dandy–Walker malformation" or "Dandy–Walker syndrome", while 20% were diagnosed with "Dandy–Walker variant" and 1.1% with "mega cisterna magna".

== History ==
The malformation was first described in 1887 by English surgeon John Bland-Sutton as hypoplasia of the cerebellar vermis, an enlarged posterior fossa and hydrocephalus. In 1914, American neurosurgeon Walter Dandy and American paediatrician Kenneth Blackfan described the malformation as partial or complete absence of the cerebellar vermis, an enlarged fourth ventricle and hydrocephalus. In 1942, American physician John K. Taggart and Canadian–American neurosurgeon Arthur Earl Walker detailed the phenomenon extensively, ascribing the potential cause as underdevelopment of the foramina of Luschka and Magendie, now no longer believed to be significant.

The term Dandy–Walker syndrome (DWS) was introduced by German psychiatrist Clemens Ernst Benda in 1954; he also used the term Dandy–Walker malformation once. In 1976, Harwood-Nash and Fitz proposed the term Dandy–Walker variant (DWV) for a malformation in which the posterior fossa is not enlarged but the cerebellar vermis is hypoplastic. In 1989, Barkovich et al. proposed the term Dandy–Walker complex (DWC) to include classic DWM and DWV (under type A) plus a third malformation (under type B) in which the cerebellar vermis remains large enough to sit between the fourth ventricle and the cisterna magna, and instead it is mostly the cisterna magna that is enlarged (sometimes diagnosed as "mega cisterna magna"). In 1999, Calabró et al. first used the phrase Dandy–Walker continuum when referring to proposals that a condition known as Blake's pouch cyst falls under the umbrella of the Dandy–Walker complex proposed by Barkovich. These additional terms are mostly discouraged by modern authors due to additional confusion and complexity to the diagnosis of DWM.
