= Arthur Earl Walker =

- Born: March 12, 1907; Winnipeg, Manitoba, Canada
- Died: January 1, 1995 (aged 87); Arizona
- Education: University of Alberta
- Known for: Description of Dandy–Walker malformation and Walker–Warburg syndrome
- Scientific career
- Fields: Neurosurgery, neuroscience and epileptology
- Workplaces: Johns Hopkins Hospital

Arthur Earl Walker (March 12, 1907 – January 1, 1995) was a Canadian-born American neurosurgeon, neuroscientist and epileptologist remembered for the eponymous syndromes Dandy–Walker syndrome, Dandy–Walker-like syndrome and Walker–Warburg syndrome. During his career he published over 400 research articles and 8 books.

== Biography ==
Arthur Earl Walker was born in 1907 in Winnipeg, Manitoba, and graduated from the University of Alberta in 1930. He undertook training at Yale University and in Amsterdam and Brussels, and continued his training as instructor of neurological surgery at the University of Chicago from 1937, becoming one of a new breed of neurosurgeons who advanced the scientific study of neurology and neurosurgery. During the Second World War he worked as Chief of Neurology at Cushing General Hospital in Framingham, Massachusetts, where he developed an interest in post-traumatic epilepsy.

In 1947, he became professor of neurological surgery at the Johns Hopkins Hospital. He was professor there for 25 years until his retirement in 1972, and during this time he established the division of neurosurgery and the formal resident training program in neurosurgery. He also established the electrophysiology laboratory which bears his name.

He was a president of the American Association of Neurological Surgeons and the World Federation of Neurological Societies, and after his retirement he became emeritus professor of neurology and neurosurgery at the University of New Mexico School of Medicine, Albuquerque.

He died on January 1, 1995, while travelling near Tucson, Arizona, apparently of a heart attack, aged 87.

== Publications ==
In 1938, he published The Primate Thalamus which explained the organization of this part of the brain. In 1951, he edited A History of Neurological Surgery.

In 1942, he published an article describing congenital atresia of the foramens of Luschka and Magendie. A similar case had previously been described by Walter Dandy in 1921, and the syndrome became known as the Dandy–Walker syndrome. He also published an article on Lissencephaly, which became known as Walker–Warburg syndrome after publication of further articles on the disorder by Mette Warburg.

In 1945–46, he published studies of the effects of penicillin on the central nervous system.
