= WASHC2C =

Protein-coding gene in the species Homo sapiens

Identifiers
- Aliases: WASHC2C, FAM21A, VPEF, FAM21C, family with sequence similarity 21 member C, WASH complex subunit 2C
- External IDs: OMIM: 613631; MGI: 106463; GeneCards: WASHC2C

Gene location (Human)
Chr.	Chromosome 10 (human)
Band	10q11.22	Start	45,727,200 bp
Band	10q11.22	End	45,792,961 bp

Gene location (Mouse)
Chr.	Chromosome 6 (mouse)
Band	6 E3|6 53.76 cM	Start	116,184,999 bp
Band	6 E3|6 53.76 cM	End	116,239,647 bp
RNA expression pattern
Bgee	Human / Mouse (ortholog); Top expressed in: sural nerve; monocyte; Achilles tendon; transverse colon; rectum; right hemisphere of cerebellum; endometrium; lymph node; granulocyte; spleen / Top expressed in: cerebellar vermis; lobe of cerebellum; internal carotid artery; external carotid artery; Paneth cell; substantia nigra; fossa; endothelial cell of lymphatic vessel; motor neuron; medullary collecting duct; More reference expression data
BioGPS	n/a
Gene ontology
Molecular function	phosphatidylinositol-3-phosphate binding; phosphatidylinositol-3,5-bisphosphate binding; phosphatidylinositol-3,4-bisphosphate binding; phosphatidylinositol-4-phosphate binding; phosphatidylinositol-5-phosphate binding; protein binding; phosphatidylinositol-4,5-bisphosphate binding; phosphatidylinositol-3,4,5-trisphosphate binding; lipid binding; retromer complex binding
Cellular component	early endosome membrane; intracellular membrane-bounded organelle; membrane; plasma membrane; retromer complex; early endosome; nucleolus; endosome; WASH complex; cytosol
Biological process	negative regulation of barbed-end actin filament capping; retrograde transport, endosome to Golgi; protein transport; regulation of substrate adhesion-dependent cell spreading; protein localization to endosome
Sources:Amigo / QuickGO
Orthologs
Databases	NCBI: entry; OMA: entry
Species	Human	Mouse
Entrez	253725	28006
Ensembl	ENSG00000172661	ENSMUSG00000024104
UniProt	Q9Y4E1	Q6PGL7
RefSeq (mRNA)	NM_001169106; NM_001169107; NM_015262; NM_001330074	NM_026585
RefSeq (protein)	NP_001162577; NP_001162578; NP_001317003; NP_056077; NP_001354322 NP_001354323; NP_001354324; NP_001354325; NP_001354326; NP_001354327; NP_001354328; NP_001354329; NP_001354330; NP_001354331; NP_001354332; NP_001354333; NP_001354334; NP_001354335; NP_001354336; NP_001354337; NP_001354338; NP_001354339; NP_001354340; NP_001354341; NP_001354342; NP_001354343; NP_001354344; NP_001354345	NP_080861
Location (UCSC)	Chr 10: 45.73 – 45.79 Mb	Chr 6: 116.18 – 116.24 Mb
PubMed search
- Wikidata
View/Edit Human	View/Edit Mouse

WASH complex subunit 2C is a protein that in humans is encoded by the WASHC2C gene. WASHC2C, also known as WASHCAP, VPEF, FAM21A, or FAM21C, is expressed ubiquitously. WASHC2C is intracellular and is mainly in the cytosol associated with vesicles. The protein has a low immune cell, human brain regional, and a low tissue specificity. Some diseases that the protein are associated with are Vaccinia and Transient Tic Disorder.

== Structure ==
The WASHC2C gene size is about 1320 amino acids with a molecular mass of 144911 daltons (Da) or 144.911 kilodaltons (kDa). The protein has a quaternary structure and a basal isoelectric point of 4.66.

== Function ==
WASHC2C is part of the WASH core complex where it functions as a nucleation-promoting factor (NPF) at the surface of endosomes. Here it recruits and activates the Arp2/3 complex to induce actin polymerization. Actin polymerization plays a key role in the fission of tubules that serve as transport intermediates during endosome sorting. WASHC2C also mediates the recruitment of F-actin-capping protein dimer to the complex as well as the recruitment of the core complex to endosome membranes via binding to phospholipids. The strongest phospholipid bonding the protein does is with phosphatidylinositol 4-phosphate, phosphatidylinositol 3,5-biphosphate and phosphatidylinositol 5-phosphate. GLUT1 5 is a protein that is recycled via the process of endosome-to-plasma membrane trafficking that WASHC2C plays an important role in . The protein is also required for the endosomal recruitment of CCC, a multi-subunit protein complex, and other subunits such as COMMD1, VPS35L and CCDC93. WASHC2C is involved in several other processes, negative regulation of barned-end actin filament capping, fluid base endocytosis endosomal transport, and regulation of substrate adhesion-dependent cell spreading.
