= Veronica Kinsler =

British physician scientist

Veronica Anne Kinsler
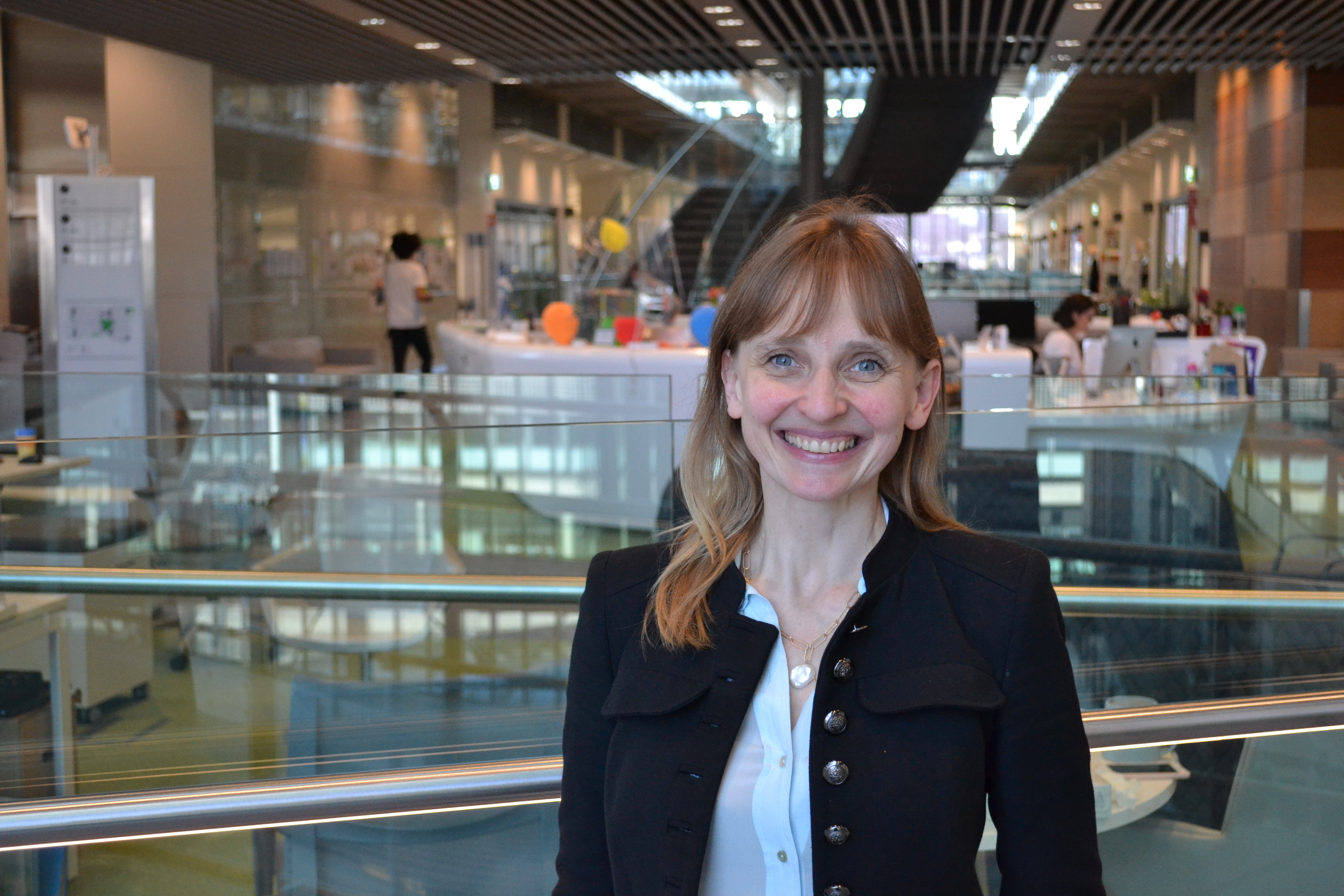
- Born: Scotland, UK
- Education: University of Cambridge, University College London
- Scientific career
- Fields: Paediatric Dermatology, Molecular Genetics, Precision Medicine
- Workplaces: Francis Crick Institute University College London Great Ormond Street Hospital
- Website: https://www.crick.ac.uk/research/find-a-researcher/veronica-kinsler

Veronica Kinsler is a British physician scientist specialising in paediatric dermatology and molecular genetics. She is Professor of Paediatric Dermatology and Dermatogenetics at the Great Ormond Street Hospital for Children (GOSH) and the University College London GOS Institute of Child Health.

== Education and career ==
Kinsler studied Medical Sciences and Clinical Medicine at the University of Cambridge, and completed a PhD in Molecular Genetics at the University College London. She also received training in paediatric dermatology.

Kinsler works both in clinical practice and as a researcher. She is a professor of Paediatric Dermatology and Dermatogenetics at the Great Ormond Street Hospital for Children (GOSH) and the University College London GOS Institute of Child Health. She also works as the Principal Group Leader and Assistant Research Director at the Francis Crick Institute in London. She was the president of the European Society of Pediatric Dermatology between 2020 and 2022. She is the senior editor of Harper's Textbook of Pediatric Dermatology. In 2021 she was awarded a Research Professorship by the National Institute for Health and Care Research (NIHR). She is a Fellow of the Royal College of Paediatrics and Child Health.

== Research ==
Her research focuses on children's skin diseases, including rare and genetic conditions, mosaicism, and diseases that can result in cancer. Her research led to the discovery of the genetic causes of multiple rare diseases, including congenital melanocytic naevus syndrome and arteriovenous malformations. Her research explores novel therapeutic approaches for currently incurable diseases.
