= Yoocanfind =

Digital platform for people with disabilities

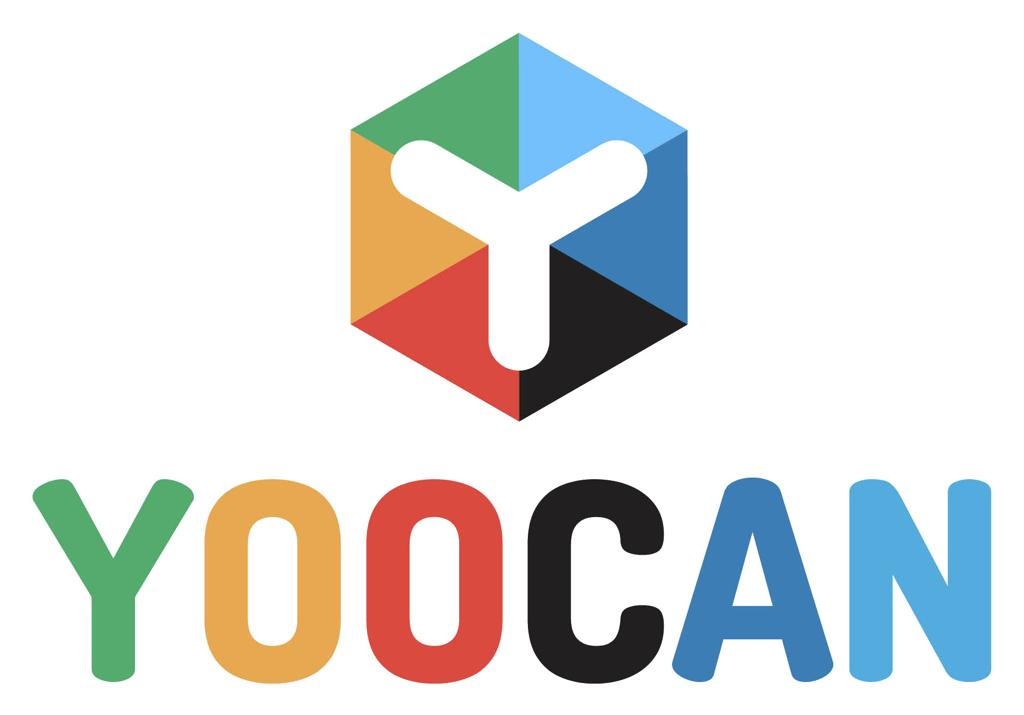
- Atraf SVG
- Website: https://yoocanfind.com/
- Launched: 2016

Yoocanfind is a digital platform that serves as a collaborative community for people with disabilities. The platform enables the sharing of personal stories, exploration of global experiences, seeking relevant information, and purchasing disability-related products. Additionally, people with disabilities use the platform to connect with others in similar situations, offering practical tips and solutions.

== Establishment ==
Erez Gaon, born in July 2008, had rare diseases causing complex cognitive and physical impairments (Congenital Melanocytic Nevus and Neurocutaneous Melanosis). The idea for Yoocanfind emerged after a long journey by his family to find information about these diseases, share experiences of people with similar conditions worldwide, and receive support and connections with others in similar situations. Yoocanfind was launched in July 2016 by Yoav Gaon, Erez's father, Moshe Gaon, his uncle, and Dror Kalisky.

Yoocanfind was created as a platform for empowerment and sharing stories, tips, and product recommendations to improve the lives of people with various disabilities.

Today, the site features thousands of stories from over 200 different countries. The platform has a significant presence in social media, showcasing daily stories of people living with disabilities. It focuses on highlighting what people can do and how they do it, sharing these experiences with a global community.
