= Dandy's point =

Common entry point for occipital burr hole

In neurosurgery, Dandy's point is a common entry point for occipital burr hole. Originally described by Walter Dandy in 1918 as a way to perform ventriculography via occipital approach. It is located 2 centimetres (0.79 in) lateral to the midline and 3 centimetres (1.2 in) above the inion. The catheter tip is directed toward a point 2 cm above the glabella and passed to a distance of 4 to 5 cm or until CSF is encountered.
