= Craniosynostosis-Dandy-Walker malformation-hydrocephalus syndrome =

- Other names: Dandy-Walker malformation with sagittal craniosynostosis and hydrocephalus Hydrocephalus, autosomal dominant Sagittal craniosynostosis, Dandy-Walker malformation and hydrocephalus Braddock-Jones-Superneau syndrome
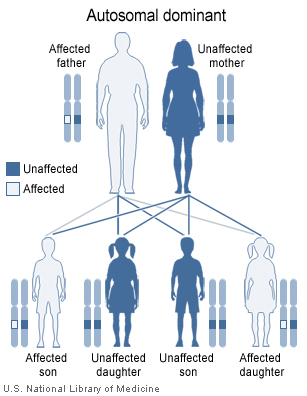
- Autosomal dominant inheritance

Craniosynostosis-Dandy-Walker malformation-hydrocephalus syndrome (HCDPH1, also known as Sagittal craniosynostosis, Dandy-Walker malformation and hydrocephalus, Dandy-Walker malformation with sagittal craniosynostosis and hydrocephalus, Braddock-Jones-Superneau syndrome, or simply Hydrocephalus, autosomal dominant) is an autosomal dominant syndrome characterized by sagittal craniosynostosis (scaphocephaly), Dandy-Walker malformation, hydrocephalus, and craniofacial dysmorphisms including hypertelorism, micrognathia, and positional ear deformities.

== Signs and symptoms ==
Features of this condition include:

- Musculoskeletal system: Dandy-Walker syndrome, sagittal craniosynostosis
- Nervous system: cerebellar vermis hypoplasia, hydrocephalus, posterior fossa cyst

== History ==
The first four cases (a mother, her two sons, and an unrelated boy) were reported in 1993. The condition was dubbed "Jones Syndrome" later that year but this term is not widely used as another condition is also known by this name. In 2010, another family of Moroccan-Jewish origin were reported to have the syndrome, and it was noted that the posterior fossa anomalies were most likely responsible for the development of hydrocephalus.

== Causes ==
The condition is caused by mutations on chromosome 8. The condition is mostly autosomal dominant but X-linked inheritance has also been suggested.
