= Neurocutaneous melanosis =

Congenital disorder involving melanocytic tumours in the skin and brain

- Other names: Neurocutaneous melanosis syndrome
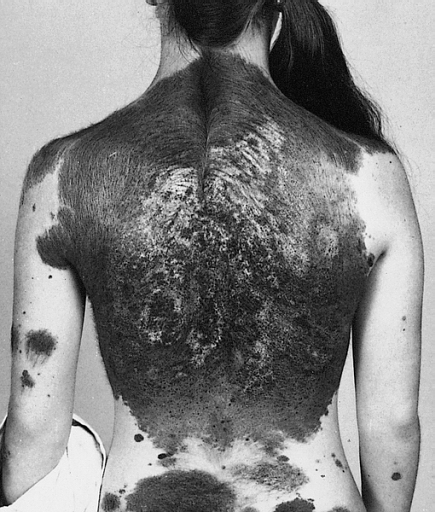
- A 13-year-old with a giant congenital melanocytic nevus, or "bathing trunk"

Neurocutaneous melanosis is a congenital disorder characterized by the presence of congenital melanocytic nevi on the skin and melanocytic tumors in the leptomeninges of the central nervous system. Although typically asymptomatic, malignancy occurs in the form of leptomeningeal melanoma in over half of patients. Regardless of the presence of malignancy, patients with symptomatic neurocutaneous melanosis generally have a poor prognosis with few treatment options. The pathogenesis of neurocutaneous melanosis is believed to be related to the abnormal postzygotic development of melanoblasts and mutations of the NRAS gene.

== Signs and symptoms ==
Neurocutaneous melanosis is associated with the presence of either giant congenital melanocytic nevi or non-giant nevi of the skin. It is estimated that neurocutaneous melanosis is present in 2% to 45% of patients with giant congenital melanocytic nevi. Patients with non-giant congenital melanocytic nevi seem to have a much lower, but undefined risk. Of these patients, only a small number are symptomatic, usually displaying symptoms before the age of 2. These symptoms are the result of melanocytic lesions being present in the leptomeninges of the central nervous system. Symptoms can include:

- Papilledema
- Cranial palsies
- Headache
- Vomiting
- Seizures

Others symptoms may also exist that are related to an increase in intracranial pressure. These symptoms seem to be present regardless of the malignancy of the melanin deposits within the central nervous system.

Approximately 10% of patient with neurocutaneous melanosis also present the Dandy–Walker syndrome and associated Dandy-Walker malformation. This malformation involves an enlargement of the posterior fossae and fourth ventricle along with agenesis of the cerebellar vermis. The abnormalities of the leptomeninges during fetal development due to neurocutaneous melanosis may be the cause of this increased incidence of the Dandy-Walker malformation. The development of hydrocephalus is the most common symptom associated with a combination of neurocutaneous melanosis and a Dandy-Walker malformation, occurring in about two out of three patients.

== Cause ==
The exact pathogenesis of neurocutaneous melanosis is not entirely clear.

One factor that may contribute to the development of neurocutaneous melanosis is the abnormal postzygotic development of melanoblasts. This mutation would possibly occur within the neural crest of the ectoderm. After the mutation occurs, these cells would then migrate to the meninges as the precursors to the malignant or benign melanocytes. This mutation may be due to abnormal expression of hepatocyte growth factor/scatter factor by the mesenchymal cells within the neural crest.

Another proposed cause of neurocutaneous melanosis is a mutation of the NRAS gene at codon 61. This mutation has been detected in patients with congenital melanocytic nevi, as well as those with melanocytic tumors of the central nervous system. The mutation would also likely occur within the neural crest.

== Diagnosis ==
If a patient displays congenital melanocytic nevi or giant congenital melanocytic nevi, the criteria for diagnosis of neurocutaneous melanosis are as follows:

- Melanocytic deposits exist within the central nervous system that are either malignant or benign
- The cutaneous lesions, giant or otherwise, are not malignant

These criteria are typically validated through biopsy of the cutaneous lesions and imaging of the central nervous system. It is important to establish that the cutaneous lesions are benign. If not, then the melanocytic deposits in the central nervous system may be the result of metastasis of cutaneous melanoma and not neurocutaneous melanosis.

Imaging has been shown to be the only reliable detection method for the presence of neurocutaneous melanosis that can be performed in living patients. Currently, the preferred imaging modality for diagnosis of neurocutaneous melanosis is magnetic resonance imaging, although ultrasound is another viable option. The signal due melanin deposits in the leptomeninges typical of neurocutaneous melanosis can be easily detected in MRI scans of patients under four months old. In patients above this age, there is some suggestion that normal brain myelination may partially obscure these signals.

As most patients with neurocutaneous melanosis are asymptomatic, those who are diagnosed through MR imaging are not guarantied to develop symptoms. Those diagnosed who did not develop symptoms ranged from 10% to 68%. This wide range is most likely due to the large number of asymptomatic, undiagnosed patients with neurocutaneous melanosis.

== Treatment ==
Once a patient with neurocutaneous melanosis becomes symptomatic, little can be done to improve prognosis as there is no effective treatment for the disorder. Most therapies are designed to treat the symptoms associated with the disorder, mainly those related to hydrocephalus. A ventriculoperitoneal shunt to relieve intracranial pressure is the preferred method.

Chemotherapy and radiotherapy have been shown to be ineffective in cases of neurocutaneous melanosis where malignancy is present. Additionally, due to the total infiltration of the central nervous system by these lesions, surgical resection is not a viable treatment option.

It has been demonstrated that early embryonic, post-zygotic somatic mutations in the NRAS gene are implicated in the pathogenesis of NCM. Recently, experimental treatment with MEK162, a MEK inhibitor, has been tried in a patient with NCM and progressive symptomatic leptomeningeal melanocytosis. Pathological studies with immunohistochemical and Western Blot analyses using Ki67 and pERK antibodies showed a potential effect of MEK inhibiting therapy. Further studies are needed to determine whether MEK inhibitors can effectively target NRAS-mutated symptomatic NCM.

== Prognosis ==
The majority of patients with neurocutaneous melanosis are asymptomatic and therefore have a good prognosis with few complications. Most are not diagnosed, so definitive data is not available. For symptomatic patients, the prognosis is far worse. In patients without the presence of melanoma, more than 50% die within 3 years of displaying symptoms. While those with malignancy have a mortality rate of 77% with most patients displaying symptoms before the age of 2.

The presence of a Dandy-Walker malformation along with neurocutaneous melanosis, as occurs in 10% of symptomatic patients, further deteriorates prognosis. The median survival time for these patients is 6.5 months after becoming symptomatic.

== History ==
Neurocutaneous melanosis was first described in 1861 by Rokitansky. It was first named by Van Bongaert in 1948. Premortem detection is difficult without the use of MRI. This, combined with the asymptomatic nature of most cases, led to the early belief that all cases were fatal. Therefore, few symptomatic cases (around 100) have been reported to date.

== See also ==
- Dandy–Walker syndrome
- Melanoma
- Phakomatosis
