= CCDC93 =

Protein-coding gene in humans

Identifiers
- Aliases: CCDC93, coiled-coil domain containing 93
- External IDs: MGI: 1918079; GeneCards: CCDC93

Gene location (Human)
Chr.	Chromosome 2 (human)
Band	2q14.1	Start	117,915,478 bp
Band	2q14.1	End	118,014,133 bp

Gene location (Mouse)
Chr.	Chromosome 1 (mouse)
Band	1|1 E2.3	Start	121,358,778 bp
Band	1|1 E2.3	End	121,434,189 bp
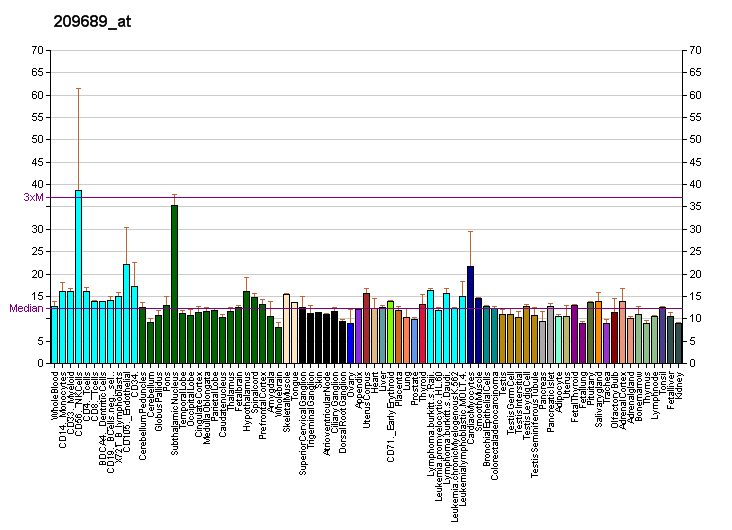

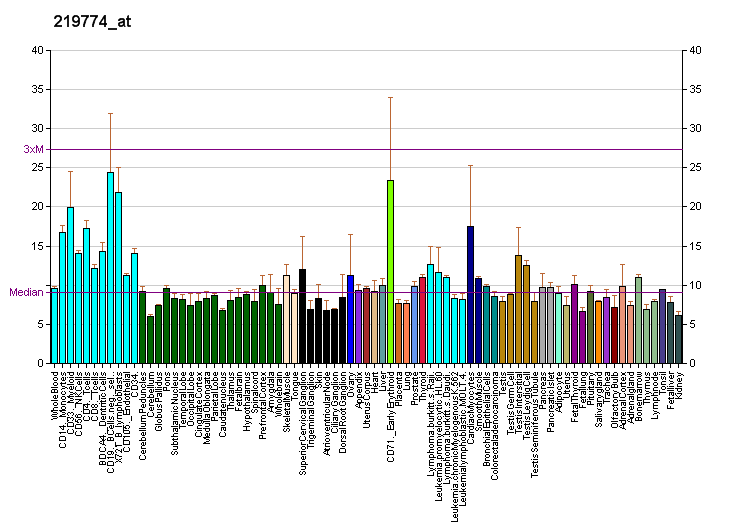

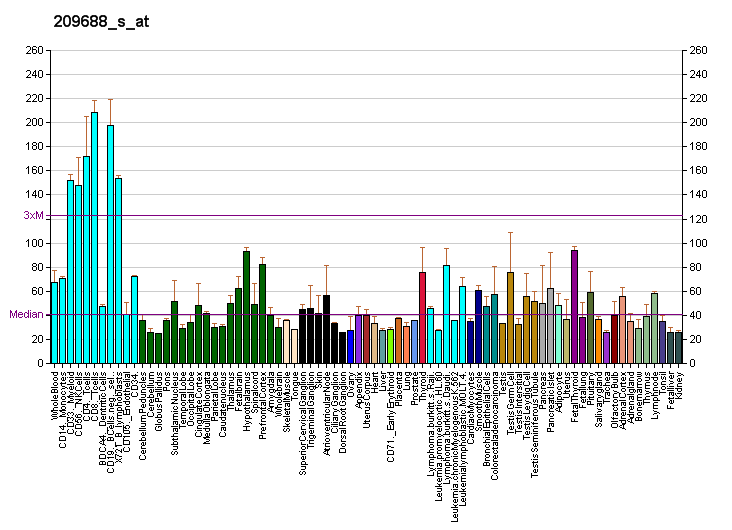
RNA expression pattern
Bgee	Human / Mouse (ortholog); Top expressed in: sural nerve; Achilles tendon; apex of heart; right testis; left testis; pituitary gland; right adrenal cortex; anterior pituitary; right uterine tube; dorsal motor nucleus of vagus nerve / Top expressed in: iris; ciliary body; facial motor nucleus; calvaria; left colon; spermatid; gastrula; seminiferous tubule; vestibular sensory epithelium; stroma of bone marrow; More reference expression data
BioGPS	More reference expression data
Gene ontology
Molecular function	protein binding
Cellular component	endosome; early endosome; intracellular membrane-bounded organelle
Biological process	protein transport; Golgi to plasma membrane transport; endocytic recycling
Sources:Amigo / QuickGO
Orthologs
Databases	NCBI: entry; OMA: entry
Species	Human	Mouse
Entrez	54520	70829
Ensembl	ENSG00000125633	ENSMUSG00000026339
UniProt	Q567U6	Q7TQK5
RefSeq (mRNA)	NM_019044	NM_001025156; NM_027567; NM_029955
RefSeq (protein)	NP_061917	NP_001020327; NP_084231
Location (UCSC)	Chr 2: 117.92 – 118.01 Mb	Chr 1: 121.36 – 121.43 Mb
PubMed search
- Wikidata
View/Edit Human	View/Edit Mouse

Coiled-coil domain-containing protein 93 is a protein that in humans is encoded by the CCDC93 gene.

== See also ==
- Coiled-coil
