= COMMD1 =

Protein-coding gene in humans

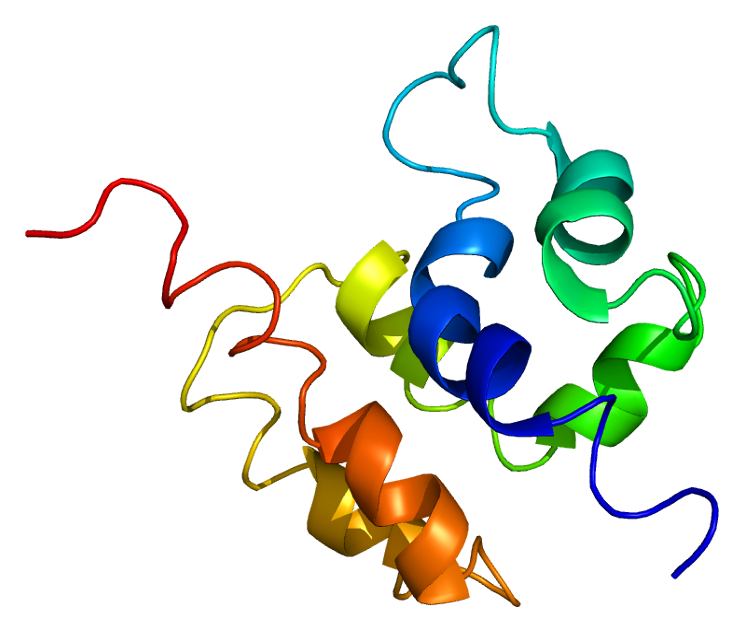

Identifiers
- Aliases: COMMD1, C2orf5, MURR1, copper metabolism domain containing 1
- External IDs: OMIM: 607238; MGI: 109474; GeneCards: COMMD1
Available structures
| PDB | Ortholog search: PDBe RCSB |
| PDB | List of PDB id codes 2H2M |

Gene location (Human)
| Chr. | Chromosome 2 (human) |
| Band | 2p15 | Start | 61,888,724 bp |
| Band | 2p15 | End | 62,147,247 bp |

Gene location (Mouse)
| Chr. | Chromosome 11 (mouse) |
| Band | 11 A3.2|11 14.22 cM | Start | 22,846,136 bp |
| Band | 11 A3.2|11 14.22 cM | End | 22,932,382 bp |
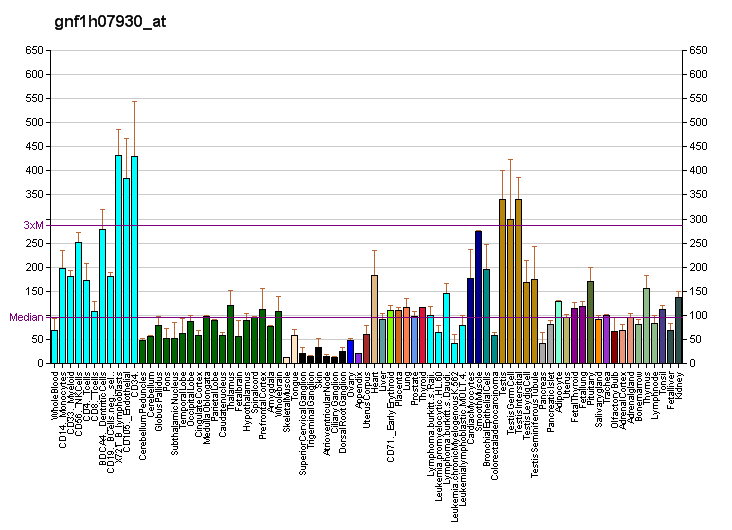
RNA expression pattern
| Bgee | Human / Mouse (ortholog); Top expressed in: myocardium of left ventricle; tibialis anterior muscle; cardiac muscle tissue of right atrium; right ventricle; deltoid muscle; Skeletal muscle tissue of biceps brachii; right auricle of heart; vena cava; skin of arm; mucosa of ileum / Top expressed in: embryo; embryo; spermatocyte; right kidney; ventricular zone; external carotid artery; intercostal muscle; epiblast; medullary collecting duct; internal carotid artery; More reference expression data |
| BioGPS | More reference expression data |
Gene ontology
| Molecular function | protein homodimerization activity; phosphatidylinositol-3,5-bisphosphate binding; metal ion binding; phosphatidylinositol-3,4-bisphosphate binding; phosphatidic acid binding; protein binding; identical protein binding; phosphatidylinositol-4,5-bisphosphate binding; copper ion binding; phosphatidylinositol-3,4,5-trisphosphate binding; lipid binding |
| Cellular component | cytoplasm; recycling endosome; endosome; membrane; Cul2-RING ubiquitin ligase complex; early endosome; endosome membrane; cytoplasmic vesicle; nucleus; nucleoplasm; cytosol |
| Biological process | negative regulation of sodium ion transmembrane transport; regulation of transcription, DNA-templated; transcription, DNA-templated; negative regulation of protein localization to cell surface; plasma membrane to endosome transport; regulation of proteasomal ubiquitin-dependent protein catabolic process; protein transport; negative regulation of NF-kappaB transcription factor activity; positive regulation of protein ubiquitination; Golgi to plasma membrane transport; post-translational protein modification; copper ion homeostasis; protein ubiquitination |
Sources:Amigo / QuickGO
Orthologs
| Databases | NCBI: entry; OMA: entry |
| Species | Human | Mouse |
| Entrez | 150684 | 17846 |
| Ensembl | ENSG00000173163 | ENSMUSG00000051355 |
| UniProt | Q8N668 | Q8K4M5 |
| RefSeq (mRNA) | NM_152516; NM_001321781; NM_001321782; NM_001371765 | NM_144514; NM_001361661 |
| RefSeq (protein) | NP_001308710; NP_001308711; NP_689729; NP_001358694 | NP_653097; NP_001348590 |
| Location (UCSC) | Chr 2: 61.89 – 62.15 Mb | Chr 11: 22.85 – 22.93 Mb |
| PubMed search |
- Wikidata
| View/Edit Human | View/Edit Mouse |

COMM domain-containing protein 1 is a protein that is encoded by the COMMD1 gene in humans. It was originally regarded as Murr1 before being differentiated and renamed by Dr. Ezra Burstein's Lab
