= WASHC5 =

Protein-coding gene in the species Homo sapiens

Identifiers
- Aliases: WASHC5, RTSC, SPG8, RTSC1, KIAA0196, WASH complex subunit 5
- External IDs: OMIM: 610657; MGI: 2146110; GeneCards: WASHC5

Gene location (Human)
Chr.	Chromosome 8 (human)
Band	8q24.13	Start	125,024,260 bp
Band	8q24.13	End	125,091,819 bp

Gene location (Mouse)
Chr.	Chromosome 15 (mouse)
Band	15|15 D1	Start	59,203,846 bp
Band	15|15 D1	End	59,246,016 bp
RNA expression pattern
Bgee	Human / Mouse (ortholog); Top expressed in: corpus callosum; Achilles tendon; stromal cell of endometrium; monocyte; bone marrow cell; epithelium of nasopharynx; epithelium of colon; islet of Langerhans; C1 segment; spinal ganglia / Top expressed in: endothelial cell of lymphatic vessel; hand; stroma of bone marrow; calvaria; epithelium of lens; foot; vas deferens; condyle; iris; otolith organ; More reference expression data
BioGPS	n/a
Gene ontology
Molecular function	protein binding
Cellular component	cytoplasm; cytosol; endosome; early endosome; WASH complex; endoplasmic reticulum; nucleoplasm; neuron projection; soma
Biological process	protein transport; endosomal transport; oocyte maturation; polar body extrusion after meiotic divisions; meiotic spindle assembly; positive regulation of neuron projection development
Sources:Amigo / QuickGO
Orthologs
Databases	NCBI: entry; OMA: entry
Species	Human	Mouse
Entrez	9897	223593
Ensembl	ENSG00000164961	ENSMUSG00000022350
UniProt	Q12768	Q8C2E7
RefSeq (mRNA)	NM_014846; NM_001330609	NM_153548
RefSeq (protein)	NP_001317538; NP_055661	NP_705776
Location (UCSC)	Chr 8: 125.02 – 125.09 Mb	Chr 15: 59.2 – 59.25 Mb
PubMed search
- Wikidata
View/Edit Human	View/Edit Mouse

WASH complex subunit 5 (also known as strumpellin) is a protein which in humans is encoded by the gene WASHC5, previously KIAA0196. The protein is a component of the WASH complex, which regulates actin assembly on intracellular vesicles. Mutations in WSHC5 are implicated in some forms of hereditary spastic paraplegia.
