= Congenital melanocytic nevus =

Congenital mole caused by genetic mutations

- Other names: congenital melanocytic naevus syndrome, congenital melanocytic naevi, congenital melanocytic nevi
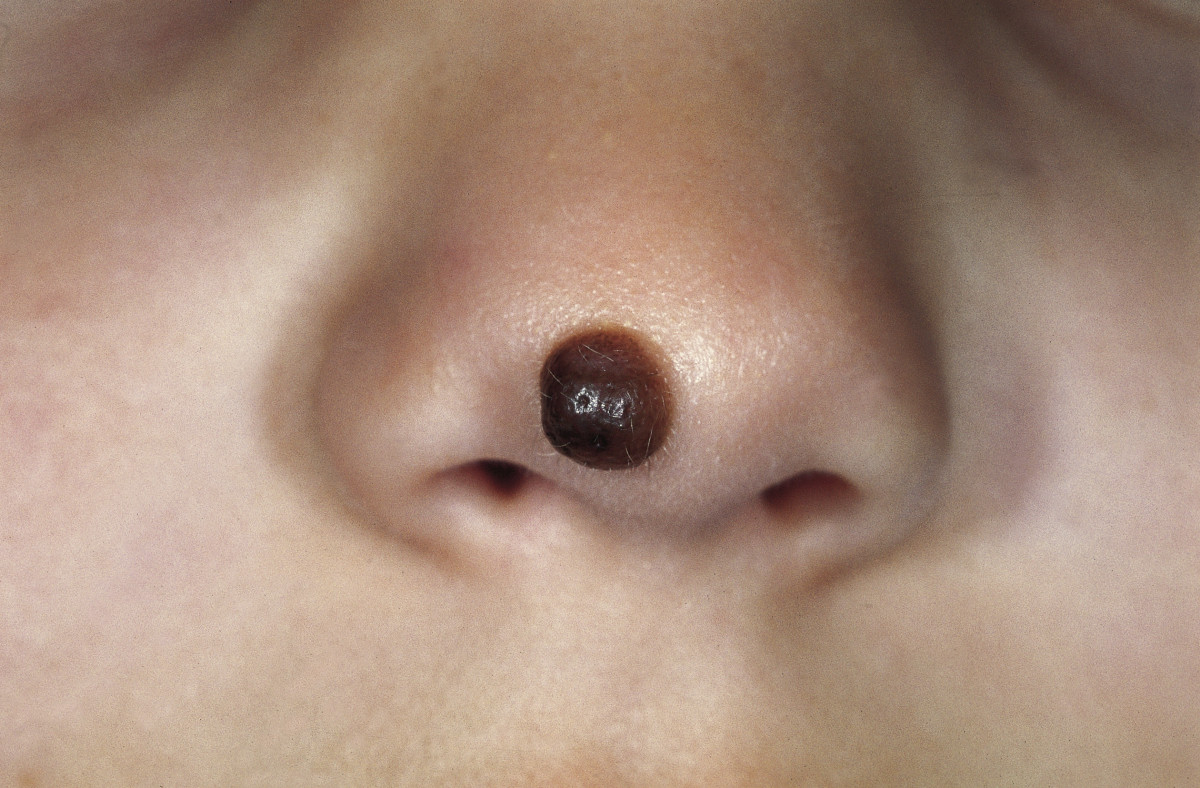
- Congenital melanocytic nevus
- Specialty: Oncology, dermatology

The congenital melanocytic nevus is a type of melanocytic nevus (or mole) found in infants at birth. This type of birthmark occurs in an estimated 1% of infants worldwide; it is located in the area of the head and neck 15% of the time.

== Signs and symptoms ==
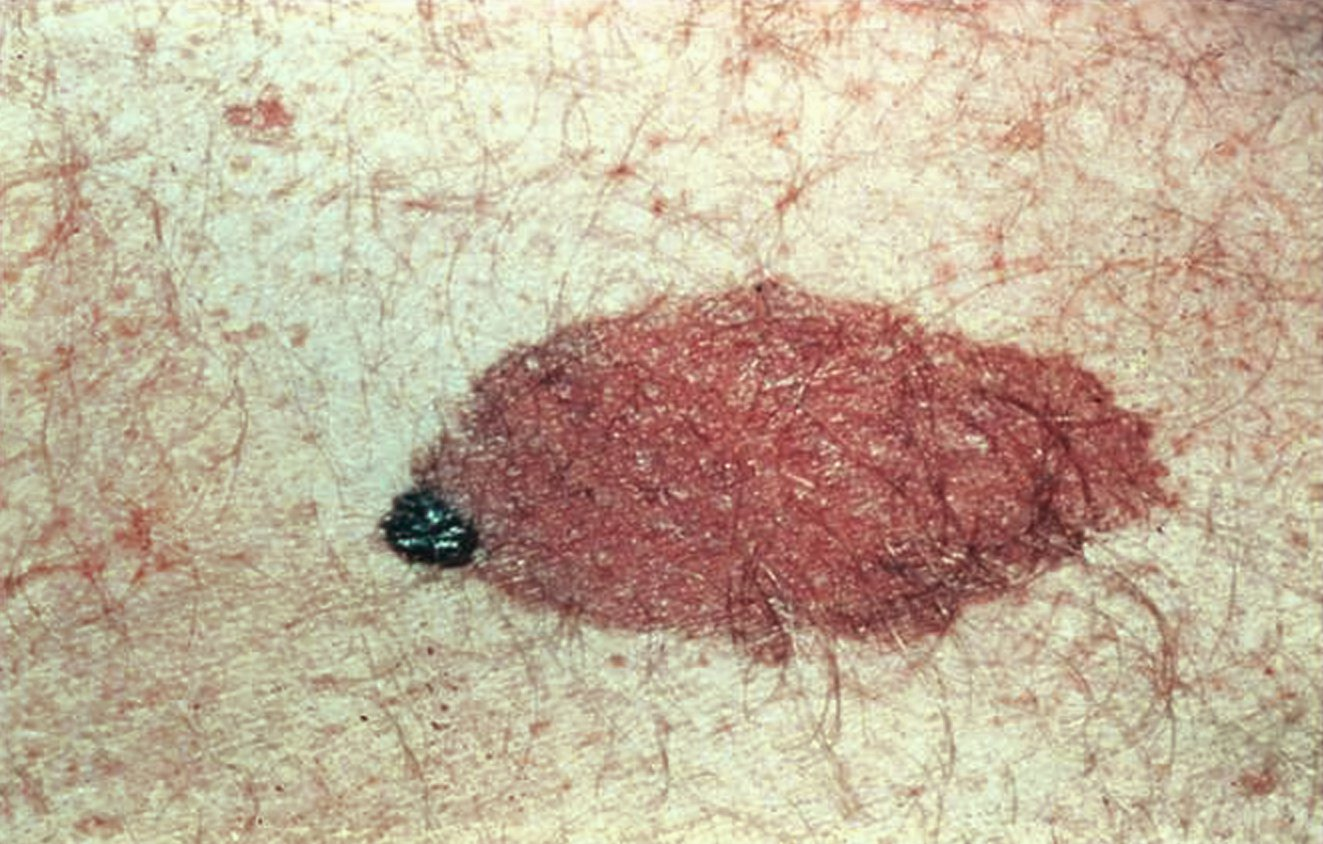
Congenital nevus. Note the variable coloration and slightly irregular border

The congenital melanocytic nevus appears as a circumscribed, light brown to black patch or plaque, potentially very heterogeneous in consistency, covering any size surface area and any part of the body.

As compared with a melanocytic nevus, congenital melanocytic nevi are usually larger in diameter and may have excess terminal hair, a condition called hypertrichosis. If over 40 cm (16 in) projected adult diameter with hypertrichosis, it is sometimes called giant hairy nevus; more usually these largest forms are known as large or giant congenital melanocytic nevus. The estimated prevalence for the largest forms is 0.002% of births.

Melanocytic nevi often grow proportionally to the body size as the child matures. As they mature, they often develop thickness, and become elevated, although these features can also be present from birth. Prominent terminal hairs often form, especially after puberty. With maturity, the nevus can have variation in color, and the surface might be textured with proliferative growths.

Neurocutaneous melanosis is associated with the presence of either giant congenital melanocytic nevi or non-giant nevi of the skin. It is estimated that neurocutaneous melanosis is present in 2% to 45% of patients with giant congenital melanocytic nevi. Neurocutaneous melanosis is characterized by the presence of congenital melanocytic nevi on the skin and melanocytic tumors in the leptomeninges of the central nervous system.

== Cause ==
Large congenital nevi are caused by a mutation in the body's cells that occurs early in embryonic development, usually within the first twelve weeks of pregnancy. Mutations are sometimes found in genes that code for NRAS and KRAS proteins. There is no known method of prevention.

== Diagnosis ==
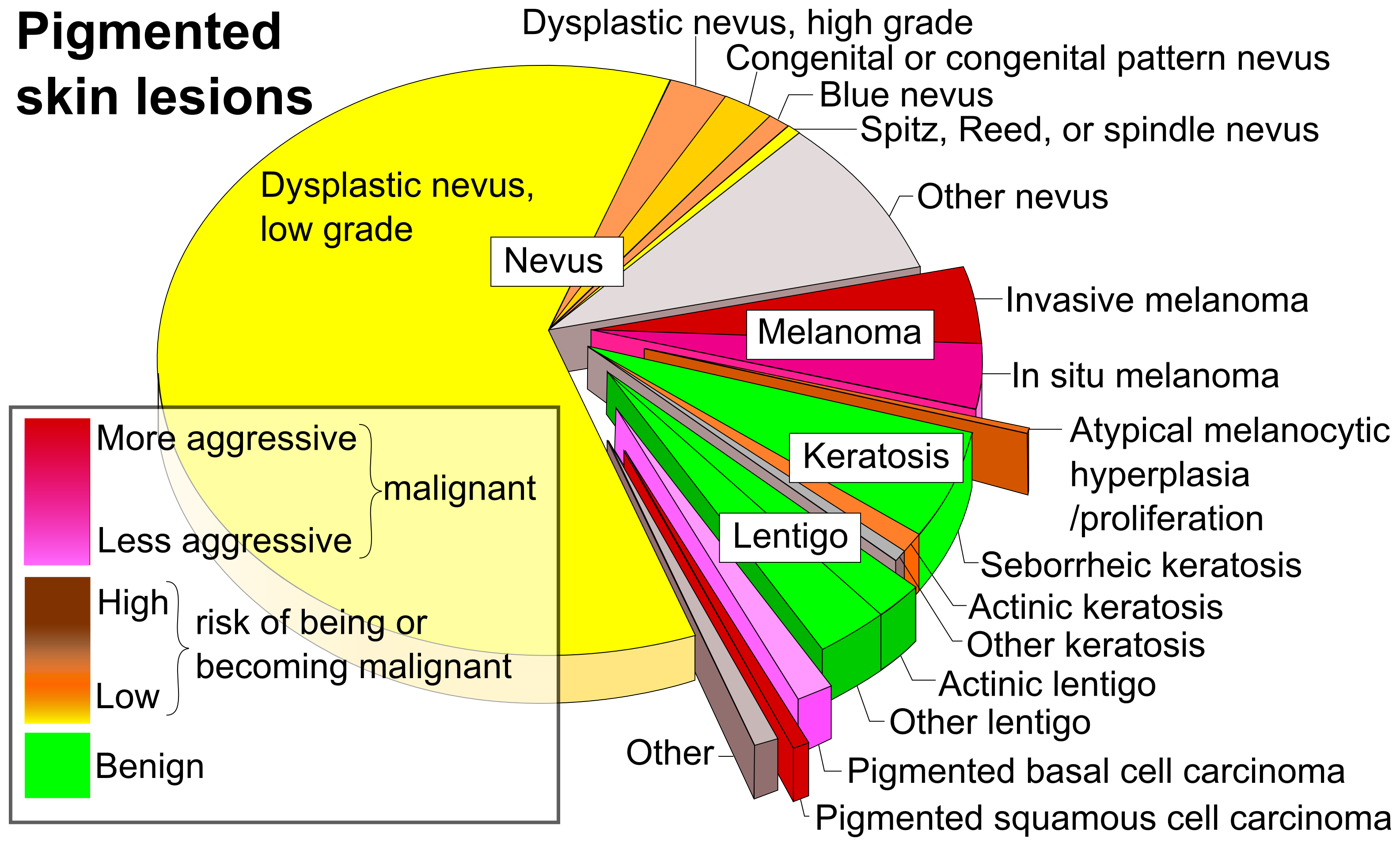
Various differential diagnoses of pigmented skin lesions, by relative incidence and malignancy potential, including "congenital or congenital pattern nevus" near top.

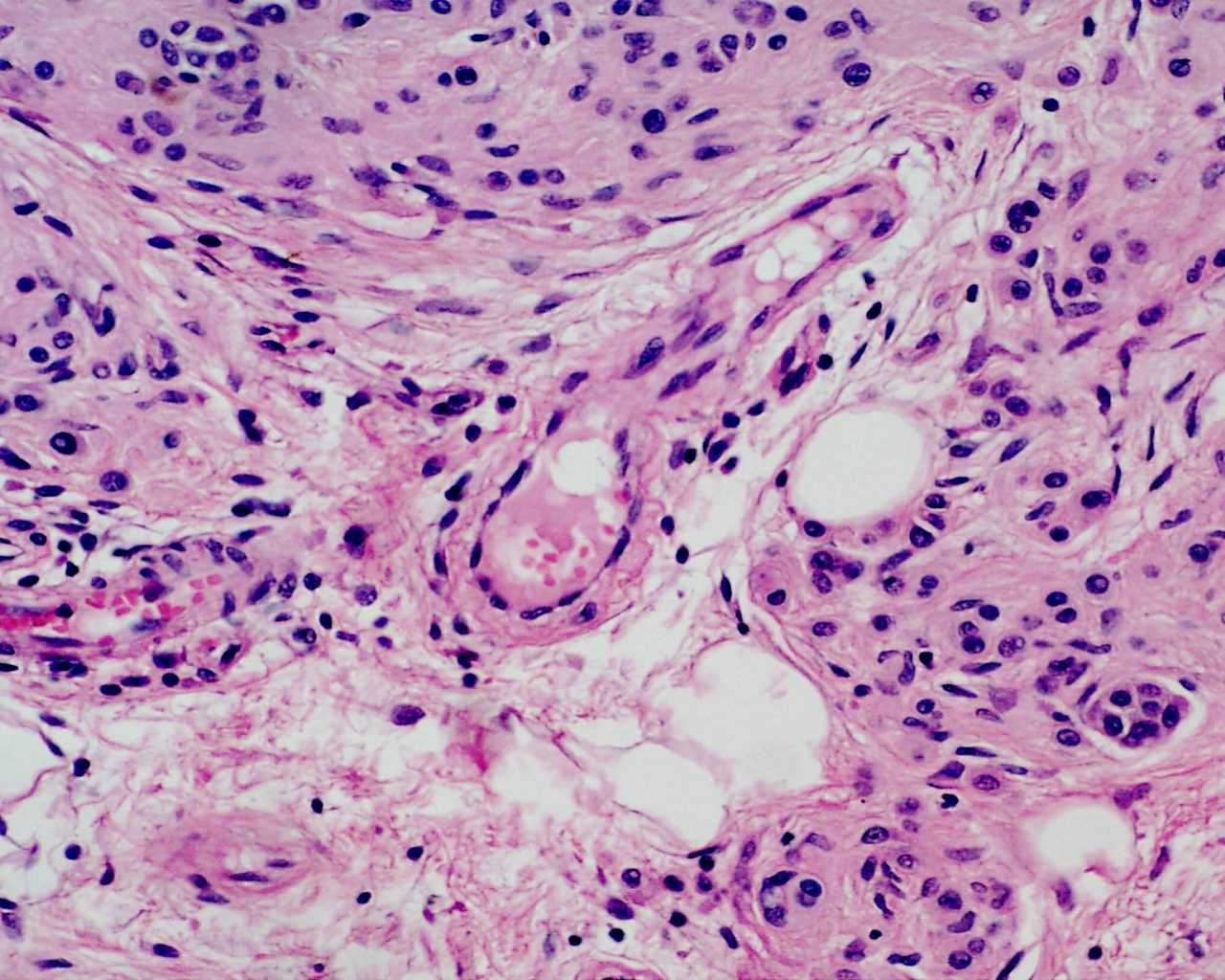
Deep congenital nevus

Benign congenital nevi can have histological characteristics resembling melanomas, often breaking most if not all of the ABCDE rules. Dermatoscopic findings of the smaller forms of benign congenital nevi can aid in their differentiation from other pigmented neoplasms.

Microscopically, congenital melanocytic nevi appear similar to acquired nevi with two notable exceptions. For the congenital nevus, the neval cells are found deeper into the dermis. Also, the deeper nevus cells can be found along with neurovascular bundles, with both surrounding hair follicles, sebaceous glands, and subcutaneous fat. Such annexes and the Subcutaneous tissue can also be hypoplasic or, conversely, present aspects of hamartoma.

=== Classification ===
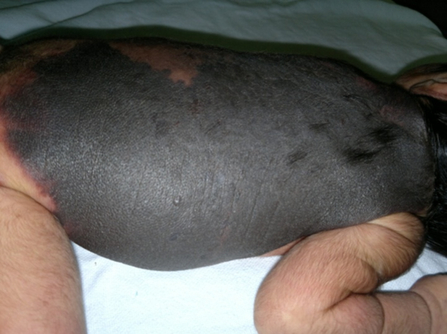
Giant congenital melanocytic nevus in newborn

Congenital melanocytic nevi may be divided into the following types:

- Small-sized congenital melanocytic nevus is defined as having a diameter less than 2 cm (0.79 in).
- Medium-sized congenital melanocytic nevus is defined as having a diameter more than 2 cm (0.79 in) but less than 20 cm (7.9 in).
- Giant congenital melanocytic nevus (also known as "bathing trunk nevus," "garment nevus," "giant hairy nevus", and "nevus pigmentosus et pilosus") is defined by one or more large, darkly pigmented and sometimes hairy patches.

== Treatment ==
Surgical excision is the standard of care. Some individuals advocate the use of hair removal laser for the treatment of congenital nevi. While this is likely safe and effective for small congenital nevus, laser removal for larger lesions might pose a liability for the laser surgeon if malignancy developed from a deep (dermal) component of the nevus that is not reached by the laser. Repigmentation after laser treatment of congenital nevi or superficial curettage supports this concern.

Many are surgically removed for aesthetics and relief of psychosocial burden, but larger ones are also excised for prevention of cancer, although the benefit is impossible to assess for any individual patient. Proliferative nodules are usually biopsied and are regularly but not systematically found to be benign. Estimates of transformation into melanoma vary from 2-42% in the literature, but are most commonly considered to be at the low end of that spectrum due to early observer bias.

== Prognosis ==
Large and especially giant congenital nevi are at higher risk for malignancy degeneration into melanoma. Because of the premalignant potential, it is an acceptable clinical practice to remove congenital nevi electively in all patients and relieve the nevocytic overload.

== See also ==
- Albinism
- List of cutaneous conditions
- Vitiligo

== Notes ==
- Kahn, Michael A. Basic Oral and Maxillofacial Pathology, Volume 1. 2001.
