= Grainyhead-like gene family =

Family of highly conserved genes for transcription factors in animals

Grainyhead-like genes are a family of highly conserved transcription factors that are functionally and structurally homologous across a large number of vertebrate and invertebrate species. For an estimated 100 million years or more, this genetic family has been evolving alongside life to fine tune the regulation of epithelial barrier integrity during development, fine-tuning epithelial barrier establishment, maintenance and subsequent homeostasis. The three main orthologues, Grainyhead-like 1, 2 and 3, regulate numerous genetic pathways within different organisms and perform analogous roles between them, ranging from neural tube closure, wound healing, establishment of the craniofacial skeleton and repair of the epithelium. When Grainyhead-like genes are impaired, due to genetic mutations in embryogenesis, it will cause the organism to present with developmental defects that largely affect ectodermal (and sometimes also endodermal) tissues in which they are expressed. These subsequent congenital disorders, including cleft lip and exencephaly, vary greatly in their severity and impact on the quality of life for the affected individual. There is much still to learn about the function of these genes and the more complex roles of Grainyhead-like genes are yet to be discovered.

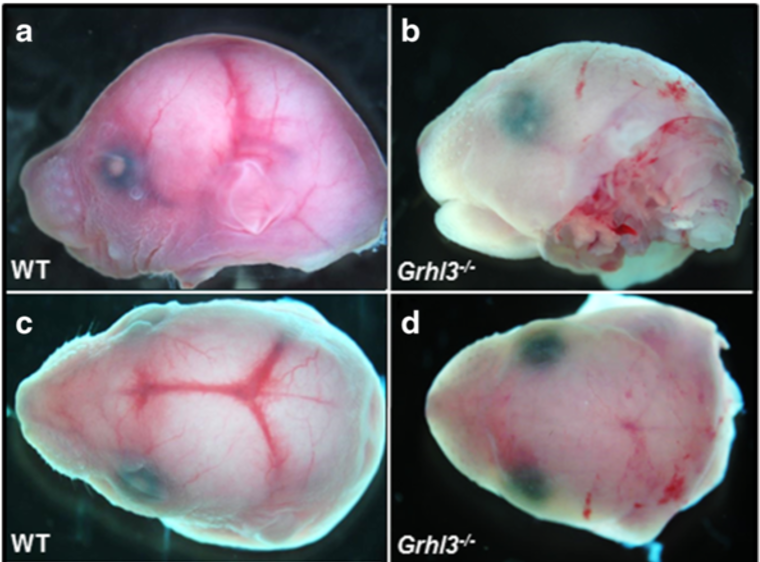
Comparison of WT (a, c) and Grhl3 KO (b, d) mice embryos at 18.5 days poss fertilization. It shows that Grhl3 KO mice have a shortened and flattened skull that is smaller in size overall, with a lack of vascularisation at the sutures. a-b are shown from a lateral view while c-d are shown from a dorsal view.

== Gene Family ==
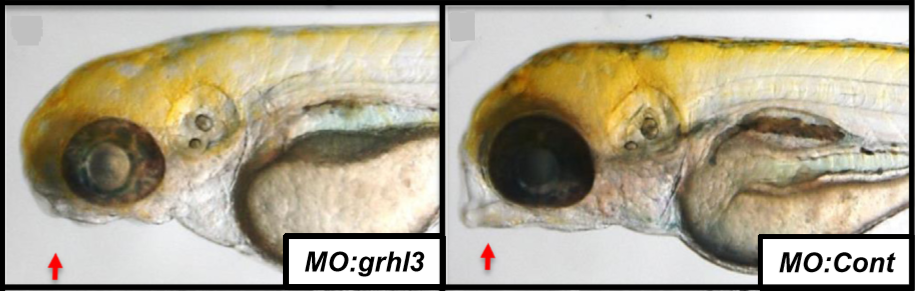
Bright field microscopy of zebrafish, comparing control and morpholino (MO) mediated knockdown of grhl3 expression, showing that loss of grhl3 leads to defective craniofacial development. The red arrow highlights the defective jaw development with less protrusion.

The Grainyhead-like (Grhl) gene family is a group of highly conserved transcription factors, which work to regulate the expression of specific target genes. Grainyhead (Grh) was originally identified in Drosophila as being implicated within development through its role of regulating numerous genetic pathways. While Drosophila has only one Grh gene, there are three homologues currently known across other species (Grhl1-3). It appears that all members of the Grhl gene family are involved in epidermal barrier integrity, including its formation and repair, and are tightly regulated to prevent physical defects. The Grhl family of genes are found in a range of organisms, from humans to fish and fungi, and all have similar roles to each other in regards to the developmental processes that they have a role in regulating. This could indicate that the Grhl genes could be one of the earliest genes to arise within our genome, providing vital functions for survival of an early common ancestor.

=== Conservation ===
The Grhl gene family is tightly conserved between species across an estimated millions of years of evolution, also maintaining the binding site (AACCGGTT) on the target genes of Grhl. While the presence of the Grhl genes varies between species, the functions regulated remain largely analogous. The reason for the presence of multiple Grhl orthologues would likely be due to speciation and the evolution of species from a common ancestor over time. Due to many animals possessing Grhl genes, there are many possible animal models available for research on the Grhl family. At present, the most characterized are the models of Drosophila, mouse and zebrafish. Interestingly, Grh was also identified in fungi, which lack epidermal tissue and instead utilize a cell wall. This gives evidence that the formation of physical barriers across all, or a large variety of, species may have had an evolutionary ancestor that initially developed barrier formation as a result of the presence of a Grhl gene.

== Orthologues ==
=== Grhl1 ===
Grhl1 is, much like the rest of the family of genes, involved in epithelial barrier formation and wound healing while the loss of Grhl1 is often associated with the activation of the skin's immune system. Knockout of grhl1 in zebrafish has shown to cause hair cell apoptosis within the inner ear which leads to sensory epithelium damage that consequently causes deafness. Grhl1 may carry out its functions through regulation of downstream genetic targets such as desmosomal cadherin genes (Dsg1) and other cadherin family genes, as a reduction in Grhl1 yields similar phenotypes to that of reduced Dsg1 expression. The desmosomes are the intercellular junctions within the epidermis and genes like Dsg1 regulate cadherin expression within these junctions. The development and differentiation of epidermal cells is regulated by Grhl1 in a tissue-specific manner in vertebrates, meaning that different tissues will respond differently to Grhl1 regulation. In regards to other craniofacial features, such as the palate and jaw, Grhl1 does not currently have any known significant role in their development.

=== Grhl2 ===
Grhl2 is involved in lower jaw formation of mammals, among other craniofacial developmental processes. It is also evolutionarily closest to Grhl1, compared to Grhl3, while still exhibiting the highly conserved functions that all Grhl genes share. It also appears that Grhl2 is involved in the fusion of the facial bones and that disruption to the regulation of Grhl2 can lead to cranioschisis/split face during embryonic development, often causing death. Continuing with the trend of incomplete fusion, the formation of the neural tube and abdominal wall is also regulated by Grhl2, evident by observation of incomplete closure of these structures, leading to spina bifida and thoracoabdominoschisis, following loss of Grhl2 function in mutant mice models for Grhl2. Additionally, over-expression of Grhl2 can also lead to mice developing spina bifida, showing the delicate balance in regulation required for Grhl2. Grhl2 is also related to breast cancer progression due to its ability to regulate epithelial cells and other processes such as epithelial-mesenchymal transition (EMT), although it is not known if EMT is promoted or inhibited by Grhl2. However, tumour progression is more associated with the epithelial tissue phenotype. Interestingly, within zebrafish there are two separate orthologues, grhl2a and grhl2b. Comparing the homology of these two orthologues to the human and mice equivalent, Grhl2, showed that grhl2b had 36 out of 47 amino acids identical (77% identical), meaning it was slightly more conserved than grhl2a, which had 34 out of 47 (72% identical). grhl2b loss causes apoptosis throughout the brain and the nervous system of zebrafish. A similar result came from a mouse study and led to the belief that grhl2b is a key survival factor for neural cells.

=== Grhl3 ===
Much the same as the previous two orthologues, Grhl3 is involved in the regulation of epidermal tissue, such as the formation of the jaw, neural tube and other craniofacial features, and does so across both land and aquatic organisms. Grhl3 is a downstream target of Irf6, and plays a key role in processes involving fusion during development much like Grhl2, especially so in the oral palate and spinal cord. A mutation of Grhl3, that causes an increase or a decrease in expression, can lead to Van der Woude syndrome, which is characterized by phenotypes that include cleft lip and/or palate and spina bifida. Primarily, Grhl3 appears to play a vital role for regulating the development of the craniofacial skeleton. A genome-wide association study found that Grhl3 is an etiological variant for a nonsyndromic form of cleft palate, ~50% of all cleft palate cases, highlighting the level of impact that dysregulation of Grhl3 has on development. Apart from the defects that are physically noticeable, Grhl3 is also expressed in the brain of mice embryos and has been shown to regulate the impulsiveness and anxiety levels of mice. Furthermore, it appears that grhl3 regulates the enveloping layer of zebrafish and axial extension as well as cell size and identity during embryonic development. If expression is disrupted during the early stages of disruption it will lead to severe defects that can lead to the death of the embryo before epiboly is complete. Epiboly is the stage of development for select organisms, such as the xenopus, sea urchin and zebrafish, when the cells of the embryo grow and migrate to the opposite end of the yolk sac to envelop it to continue developing.

== Developmental defects ==
=== Associated defects/diseases ===
There are thousands of deaths a year of infants, either during or shortly after birth, and the leading cause of these deaths are congenital birth defects (CBDs), which are defined as abnormalities of the chromosomes. In the year 2004, CBDs had been the cause of over 139,000 hospitalizations in the U.S. and had cost the community $2.6 billion in healthcare and medical supplies. While some CBDs can be easily fixed by simple surgery or medication, such as cleft lip, there are still life threatening diseases that are caused by mutations to the Grhl family members or genetic pathways that they are associated with. In developing countries, where there is a large percentage of the population in poverty, families struggle to receive the necessary treatment to combat CBDs and the extent at which the quality of life is affected is continually worsening. Members of the Grhl3 family are closely related to endodermal tissues and the issues that can arise from a mutation in one of the Grhl family members can include respiratory problems, loss of hearing, spina bifida and much more. Grhl3 has been shown to be a downstream target of genes such as Fgf8 and Irf6, of which the associated pathways are involved in the aetiology of Van der Woude syndrome.

=== Role in disease ===
Disease	What it is	Grhl family member involved	Reference
Anxiety and impulsiveness	These factors are linked to diseases such as ADHD and numerous forms of anxiety.	Grhl3 (mice)	
Breast cancer progression	Over-expression promotes tumour growth and metastasis due to its role in regulating epithelial cell phenotype and EMT.	Grhl2 (human & mice)	
Cleft lip/palate (Van der Woude syndrome)	Incomplete fusion of the lip and/or palate, affects 1 in 700 newborns.	grhl3 (mice) and Grhl2 (mice)	
Craniofacial defects	Abnormalities in growth of facial features, such as development of the lower jaw and pharyngeal arches.	Grhl2 (mice) and grhl3 (zebrafish)	
Deafness	Loss of ability to hear sound due to loss of ability to detect and/or interpret sound waves.	grhl1 (zebrafish) and Grhl2 (zebrafish)	
Disrupted locomotor development	Change in movement behaviour that includes factors such as stride length, stride frequency and gait.	Grhl3 (mice)	
Exencephaly	When the brain is located outside of the skull and is usually an early stage of anencephaly.	Grhl3 (mice)	
Midbrain-Hindbrain defects	Defects in patterning and folding of the midbrain-hindbrain barrier that can lead to neural cell death.	grhl2b (zebrafish)	
Skin barrier defects	Defects in the formation of the skin during embryonic development leading to death via dehydration	Grhl3 (mice)	
Skin cancer (squamous cell carcinoma)	Increased survival and growth of squamous cells in the epidermis.	Grhl3 (human & mice)	
Spina bifida	Incomplete closure of the neural tube during development with the spinal cord exposed to varying degrees.	Grhl3 (mice)	
Split face (cranioschisis)	Failure of the cranium to close and leads to brain exposure, degeneration and eventual anencephaly.	Grhl2 (mice) and Grhl3 (mice)	
Thoracoabdominoschisis	Incomplete closure of the body wall, leading to opening of the thoracic and/or abdominal cavity.	Grhl2 (mice)	
Wound healing	The healing and closure of epithelial tissue after a lesion occurs, associated with cell migration within the epidermis.	Grhl3 (mice)	
