= Lipomeningomyelocele =

Birth defect in which a tumor of fat grows on the spinal cord

In neurology, a lipomyelomeningocele is a type of closed neural tube defect that affects around 3 to 6 babies out of 100,000 births. It is an example of a spinal lipoma, which is a collection of adipose tissue, or fat, that is located at or around the spinal cord. Essentially, it is a tumor of fat located on the spinal cord. A lipomyelomeningocele defect is present at birth and can present with physical defect of the spine and back, and it can also cause various neurological symptoms such as weakness and bladder and bowel incontinence. The general treatment for this spinal defect is surgical detachment of the lipoma from the spine.

== Embryology ==
A lipomyelomeningocele develops during the early stages of central nervous system (CNS) development. There are two main phases of CNS development, primary and secondary neurulation. During primary neurulation, the very first aspects of the nervous system, known as the notochord and the neural plate, begin to fold over themselves to form what is known as the neural tube. The neural tube is what will become the brain and the spinal cord, which comprise the CNS. Another layer of developing tissue, known as the ectoderm, will form the skin behind the developing spinal cord, while the mesoderm, yet another layer of tissue, will form the muscles and fat that will be around the cord. Ideally, the neural tube, i.e. the developing spinal cord, will close before the full development of the fat and muscle formed by the mesoderm. In lipomyelomeningocele and other spinal lipomas, however, the mesoderm forming the fat will migrate into the neural tube. The mesoderm and neural tube will continue to develop until a tumor of fat is formed. Later in development, membranes known as meninges will form around the neural tube, but in a lipomyelomeningocele, there is a disruption in their formation that will create a space for the meninges and the lipoma to spread towards the skin behind the spinal cord.

In secondary neurulation, the mesoderm that will form the bones of the spine will fuse with the developing neural tube. It is possible that a lipomyelomeningocele can form during a disruption of this process, but this is not completely understood yet.

Lipomyelomeningoceles usually are formed during the early stages of pregnancy, usually weeks four to six. As opposed to other neural tube defects, there is no established role of folate deficiency in the development of this disorder. There is also no known genetic predisposition.

== Classification ==
There are three major classification of spinal lipomas, which lipomyelomeningoceles fall into. The majority of spinal lipomas occur in the lower back on the lumbar spine. The first is the dorsal type, which means that the disruption of the spinal cord occurs on the dorsal, i.e. towards the back, portion of the spinal cord. There may be nerves affected, but these types of spinal lipomas generally do not extend into the conus medullaris, which is the ends of spinal cord nerves. Dorsal lipomas are typically caused by errors in primary neurulation.

In the caudal group of spinal lipomas, the place where the lipoma and spinal cord elements meet is located mainly inside of the spinal cord and affects the conus medullaris directly. Caudal spinal lipomas are caused by errors in secondary neurulation.

The transitional group is a combination of the dorsal and caudal types. An important characteristic of these is that there are elements of nerves that can be found within the lipoma itself. Transitional spinal lipomas are caused by errors in both primary and secondary neurulation.

== Presentation ==
Lipomyelomeningiomas typically present with skin and neurological abnormalities. Examples of skin manifestations are subcutaneous lipomas, capillary hemangiomas, complex dimples, and abnormal hair growth on the body, typically the lower back. Serious skin findings are more rare than these other more typical findings. There are also a number of musculoskeletal findings. They all result from the effects of the lipoma on the spine. Abnormal curvature of the spine, scoliosis, and deformities of the spine and legs distal to the lipoma are common. Due to the proximity of the lipomas to the nerves regulating continence, both stool and urinary incontinence are common. Neurological symptoms such as weakness, abnormalities of sensation, and pain can be common but may manifest later on in an individual's life.

Commonly, individuals who are not diagnosed with lipomyelomeningioma can be asymptomatic. When the person grows, there is added stress on the spine, especially If there is a rotational aspect to the lipoma, causing the person to begin having symptoms later on.

Lipomyelomeningiomas are associated with a number of other disorders

- Chiari malformation type 1
- Spina bifida
- Split cord malformations
- Associated dermal sinuses
- Dermoid or epidermoid cysts
- Diastematomyelia
- Terminal hydromyelia
- Down Syndrome

== Diagnosis ==
The most common way to diagnose a lipomyelomeningioma is through ultrasound. It is possible to be able to see a neural tube defect as early as 18 to 20 weeks into pregnancy. If this is not found during pregnancy, the definitive way to diagnose a lipomyelomeningioma or any other spinal lipoma is through magnetic resonance imaging (MRI). Adjunct imaging such as plain radiographs (X-ray) or computed tomography (CT) can help assess for any defects in bone structure.

== Management ==
Management for lipomyelomeningioma can either be conservative or surgical. Conservative management is mainly supportive, with periodic checks to assess for progression or development of symptoms. It has been suggested that individuals who are asymptomatic should not receive surgical interventions due to risk of worsening of clinical condition.

For individuals who are asymptomatic, it is possible to receive surgical intervention. There are two main surgical approaches. The first and more traditional is to partially remove the lipoma, carefully remove interfering tissue surrounding the spinal cord, then repairing the area by duraplasty. A second method that is less common and newer is to remove vertebral bones in an osteotomy in the attempt to reduce tension on the spinal cord. Surgical management and the preferred procedures vary by institution. In general, the more tension and rotation there is of the spine, the more likely it is for the individual to be symptomatic and require surgery. However, as the severity of the lipoma increases, so too does the risk for adverse events from the surgery or for the procedure to not relieve symptoms.

Even with surgical treatment of lipomyelomenigngioma, it is possible that there will be no clear improvement in the individuals' condition. It has been shown that there is improvement only around ten percent of the time, while there majority of the time there is no change.

== See also ==
- Lipomeningocele
- Tethered spinal cord syndrome
