= MOMS Trial =

Clinical trial

The MOMS Trial was a clinical trial that studied treatment of a birth defect called myelomeningocele, which is the most severe form of spina bifida. The study looked at prenatal (before birth) and postnatal (after birth) surgery to repair this defect. The first major phase concluded that prenatal surgery had strong, long-term benefits and some risks.

The name of the trial stands for Management of Myelomeningocele Study. It was funded by the Eunice Kennedy Shriver National Institute of Child Health and Human Development (NICHD) and was done by The Children's Hospital of Philadelphia, the University of California, San Francisco, Vanderbilt University Medical Center in Nashville and the George Washington University in Washington, D.C.

== Introduction ==
Spina bifida, or myelomeningocele, is a type of open neural tube defect that can occur with problems with the early development of a fetus. Most researchers believe that both genetic and environmental factors (such as diet) play a role. During the first 28 days of a pregnancy, the brain and spinal cord form in the developing fetus. The causes of human Spina bifida are not proven. The majority of babies with open spina bifida have a variety of medical problems including nerve damage and problems with motor function, this may include some amount of paralysis of the lower part of their body (this ranges from very mild to quite severe), loss of control of their bowels and bladder, and abnormalities of the brain. Closed spina bifida is probably more common than is currently recognised and includes a range of subtle abnormalities where the neural tube is closed. This is sometimes referred to as spina bifida occulta.

Historically, spina bifida was not detected before birth. Maternal serum screening of elevated alpha-fetoprotein at 16 to 18 weeks of gestation, followed by amniocentesis allowed detection of a minority of cases. A better option is the assessment of Acetyl choline Esterase form amniotic fluid. Today, detection rate is 98% at the time of an anatomical screen ultrasound at 20 weeks of gestation.

For decades the standard treatment has been to close the spinal defect soon after the baby is born. This is called postnatal surgery. It can also be treated through an experimental operation performed while the baby is still in the mother's womb, called prenatal surgery. The benefits of prenatal surgery remain unproven.

== History ==
1980 - Fetal surgical techniques using animal models were first developed at the University of California, San Francisco by Dr. Michael R. Harrison, Dr. N. Scott Adzick and colleagues.

1994 - The surgical model that is most similar to simulating the human disease is the fetal lamb model of myelomeningocele (MMC) introduced by Meuli and Adzick in 1994. The MMC-like defect was surgically created at 75 days of gestation (term 145 to 150 days) by a lumbo-sacral laminectomy. Approximately 3 weeks after creation of the defect a reversed latissimus dorsi flap was used to cover the exposed neural placode and the animals were delivered by cesarean section just prior term. Human MMC-like lesions with similar neurological deficit were found in the control newborn lambs. In contrast, animals that underwent closure had near-normal neurological function and well-preserved cytoarchitecture of the covered spinal cord on histopathological examination. Despite mild paraparesis, they were able to stand, walk, perform demanding motor test and demonstrated no signs of incontinence. Furthermore, sensory function of the hind limbs was present clinically and confirmed electrophysiologically. Further studies.showed that this model when combined with a lumbar spinal cord myelotomy leads to the hindbrain herniation characteristic of the Chiari II malformation and that in utero surgery restores normal hindbrain anatomy.

Surgeons at Vanderbilt University, led by Dr. Joseph Bruner, attempted to close spina bifida in 4 human fetuses using a skin graft from the mother using specialized telescope called a laparoscope. Four cases were performed before stopping the procedure - two of the four fetuses died.

1998 - Dr. N. Scott Adzick and team at The Children's Hospital of Philadelphia performed open fetal surgery for spina bifida in an early gestation fetus (22-week gestation fetus) with a successful outcome.

Surgeons at Vanderbilt University, led by Dr. Noel Tulipan, made an incision in the mother's uterus to obtain better exposure to fetuses of 28 to 30 weeks gestation. All 4 fetuses were born premature but with evidence of reversal of their chiari II malformation. Only 2 of the 4 required ventricular shunts after birth. Fetal surgery after 25 weeks has not shown benefit in subsequent studies

Subsequently, 4 medical centers conducted 253 open spina bifida repairs prior to the MOMs trial. The outcomes were mixed and the only comparison groups were other children that had not undergone repair after birth in the past.

In February 2003, the National Institutes of Health began the Management of Myelomeningocele Study (MOMS). Three centers (Vanderbilt University, Children's Hospital of Philadelphia and the University of California at San Francisco) were chosen to participate in the study of 183 fetuses which were randomized, 91 for fetal repair and 92 for postnatal repair. The study took 8 years to complete at a cost of $22.5 million. Of the 1,087 fetuses and mothers initially screened for the study, 183 met all the inclusion criteria. The Children's Hospital of Philadelphia treated 77 patients, University of California at San Francisco treated 54 and Vanderbilt University treated 52.

Medical information on the mothers and babies were gathered throughout the study and follow-up of their progress continued until the child reached at least two and a half years of age. Two outcomes were considered. The first, at 12 months, was death or need for a ventricular shunt. The second, measured at 30 months, was a composite score of standardized tests for mental and motor development.

== Outcomes of the Trial ==
An interim analysis conducted in December 2010, made public in February 2011, and released in the New England Journal of Medicine in March 2011, showed a statistically significant benefit to the surgery and closed the trial. The trial demonstrated that outcomes after prenatal spina bifida treatment are improved to the degree that the benefits of the surgery typically outweigh the maternal risks.

Based on these outcomes, fetal repair of spina bifida has been adopted at some fetal centers. Prenatal repair is a complex procedure that requires specialized multidisciplinary care for both the pregnant individual and the fetus. Outcomes are influenced by the experience of the surgical team and institutional resources, which may limit the generalizability of results to broader clinical settings.

== See also ==
- Open fetal surgery
- Neural tube defect
- Spina Bifida
