= Tethered cord syndrome =

Neurological disorders

Tethered spinal cord syndrome
- Other names: Occult spinal dysraphism sequence
- Specialty: Neurosurgery

Tethered cord syndrome (TCS) refers to a group of neurological disorders that relate to malformations of the spinal cord. Various forms include tight filum terminale, lipomeningomyelocele, split cord malformations (diastematomyelia), occult, dermal sinus tracts, and dermoids. All forms involve the pulling of the spinal cord at the base of the spinal canal, literally a tethered cord. The spinal cord normally hangs loose in the canal, free to move up and down with growth, and with bending and stretching. A tethered cord, however, is held taut at the end or at some point in the spinal canal. In children, a tethered cord can force the spinal cord to stretch as they grow. In adults the spinal cord stretches in the course of normal activity, usually leading to progressive spinal cord damage if untreated. TCS is often associated with the closure of a spina bifida. It can be congenital, such as in tight filum terminale, or the result of injury later in life.

== Signs and symptoms ==
In children, symptoms may include:

- Lesions, hairy patches, dimples, hemangiomas, or fatty tumours on the lower back

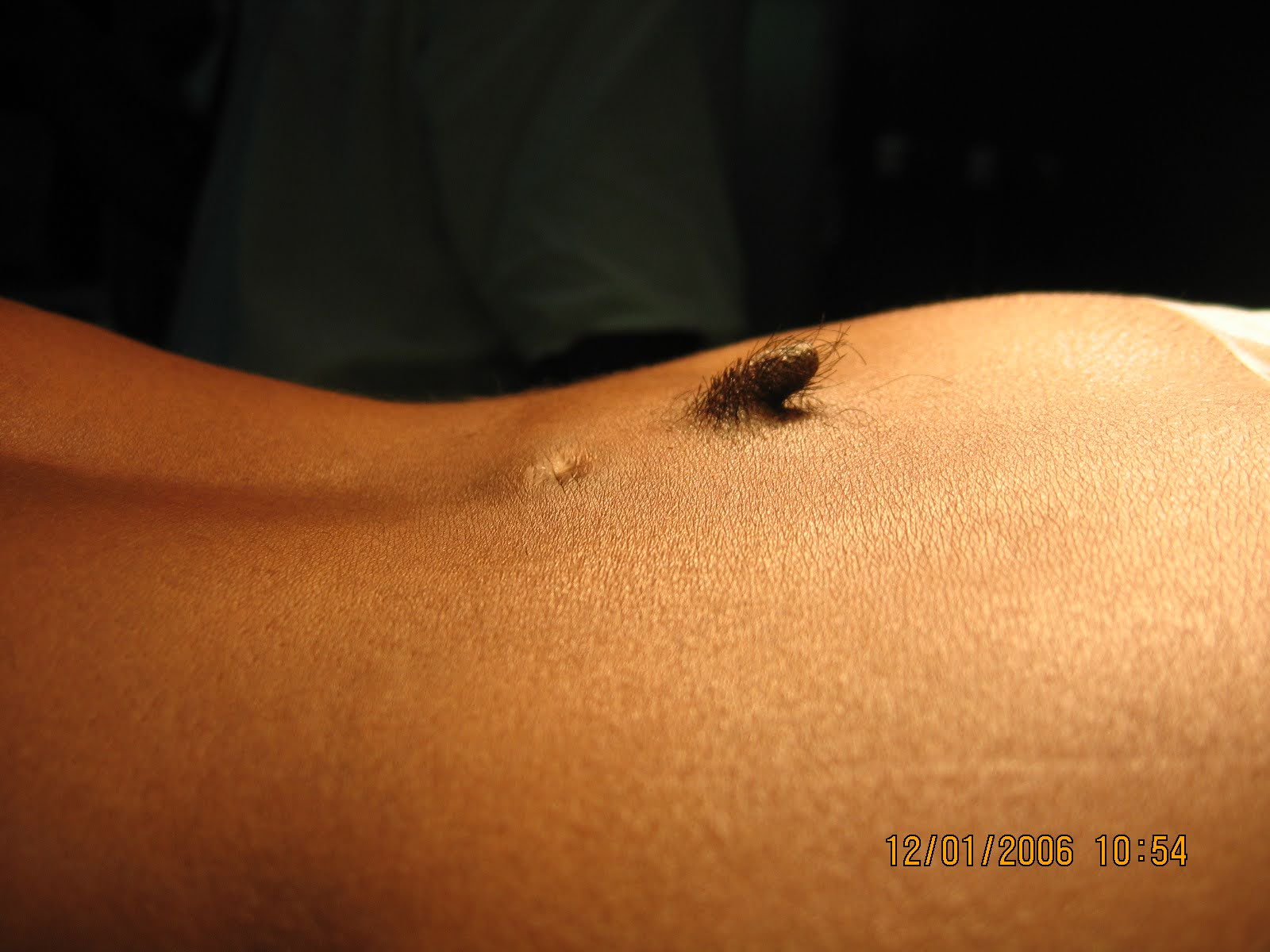
Skin manifestation typical of tethered cord syndrome

- Foot and spinal deformities
- Weakness in the legs (loss of muscle strength and tone)
- Change in or abnormal gait including awkwardness while running or wearing the tips or side of one shoe Symptoms such as "leg drag" or a leg giving out may signal a need for immediate surgery according to a leading neurosurgeon who specializes in this area.
- Low back pain
- Scoliosis (abnormal curvature of the spine to the left or right)
- Urinary irregularities (incontinence or retention)

Tethered spinal cord syndrome may go undiagnosed until adulthood, when sensory, motor, bowel, and bladder control issues emerge. This delayed presentation of symptoms relates to the degree of strain on the spinal cord over time.Tethering may also develop after spinal cord injury. Scar tissue can block the flow of fluids around the spinal cord. Fluid pressure may cause cysts to form in the spinal cord, a condition called syringomyelia. This can lead to additional loss of movement or feeling, or the onset of pain or autonomic nervous system symptoms.

In adults, onset of symptoms typically include:

- Severe pain (in the lower back and radiating into the legs, groin, and perineum)
- Bilateral muscle weakness and numbness
- Loss of feeling and movement in lower extremities
- Urinary irregularities (incontinence or retention)
- Bowel control issues

Neurological symptoms can include a mixed picture of upper and lower motor neuron findings, such as amyotrophy, hyperreflexia or hyporeflexia, a positive stretch sign, and pathologic plantar response, occurring in the same limb. Profound sensory changes, such as loss of pain, temperature, and proprioceptive sensations, are common. Last, progressive symptoms of a neuropathic bladder are noted on over 70% of adult patients, versus only 20% to 30% of children. These symptoms include urinary frequency and urgency, feeling of incomplete voiding, poor voluntary control, nocturia, and urge and stress incontinence. Chronic recurrent infections are common and occasionally lead to nephrolithiasis (kidney stones), kidney failure, or kidney transplantation. Female patients also give a history of ineffective labor and postpartum rectal prolapse, presumably due to an atonic pelvic floor.

=== Related disorders ===
Are the following

- Kyphosis
- Scoliosis
- Brain herniation
- Spina bifida
- Ehlers–Danlos syndrome
- Klippel–Feil syndrome
- Syringomyelia

== Cause ==
Tethered spinal cord can be caused by various conditions but the main cause is when tissue attachments limit the movement of the spinal cord in the spinal column which causes abnormal stretching of the cord. The tethered spinal cord syndrome is correlated with having the causes:

- Spina bifida
  - Occulta
  - Mylomeningocele
  - Meningocele
- History of spinal trauma
- History of spinal surgery
- Tumor(s) in the spinal column
- Thickened and/or tight filum terminale
- Lipoma(s) in the spinal column
- Dermal Sinus Tract (congenital deformity)
- Diastematomyelia (split spinal cord)

Tethered spinal cord is a disorder and not a mechanism so it does not spread to other people and there are no measures that can be done to prevent it beforehand. The only preventative measure that is successful is to surgically untether the spinal cord though there might already be irreversible damage.

=== Spina bifida ===
In tethered spinal cord cases spina bifida can be accompanied by tethering of the spinal cord but in rare cases with Spina bifida occulta. Tethering of the spinal cord tends to occur in the cases of Spina bifida with mylomeningocele. In most people the spine grows faster than the spinal cord during development which causes the end of the spinal cord to appear to rise relative to the bony spine next to it. By the time of birth the spinal cord is located between L1 and L2. In a baby with Spina bifida the spinal cord is still attached to the skin around it preventing it from rising properly. This occurs because the spinal cord in a child with Spina bifida is low lying and tethered at the bottom. At the time of birth the mylomeningocele is separated from the skin but the spinal cord is still stuck in the same place. As the child begins to grow the spinal cord remains in the same place becoming stretched out causing the tight cord and the tethering at the end. With this type of tethering there is an interference with the blood supply to the nerves and body which can then cause the deterioration of the body causing orthopedic, neurological, and urological problems. With milder forms of spina bifida such as occulta, may be related to the degree of strain on the cord which can become worse with physical activity, injury, pregnancy, bone spurs, or spinal stenosis. The tethered cord in this case might not be diagnosed until adulthood when it worsens and can still cause neurological, orthopedic, and urological dysfunctions.

== Mechanism ==
Tethered spinal cord syndrome is a clinical entity which is manifested by progressive motor and sensory changes in:

- legs
- incontinence
- back of leg pain
- scoliosis

In order to understand the pathophysiology that is involved in a tethered spinal cord, the reduction/oxidation ratio has to be used in vivo of cytochrome alpha and alpha 3 to signal the oxidative metabolic functioning in humans. Studies have found that marked metabolic and electrophysiological susceptibility to hypoxic stress to the lumbar and sacral portion of the spinal cord under traction with various weights. Similar effects were found in redox behavior of tethered spinal cord during the surgical procedures to repair it. This can be due to impairment of mitochondrial oxidative metabolism under constant or intermittent stretching. The act of prolonged stretching can lead to structural damage to the neural perikarya and eventually the axons in neurons. The untethering process can improve the oxidative metabolism and can help to repair injured neurons.

== Diagnosis ==
TCS is a clinical diagnosis that should be based on "neurological and musculoskeletal signs and symptoms. Imaging features are in general obtained to support rather than make the diagnosis." This is especially true for cases of occult tethered cord, where the patient has the symptoms of tethered cord syndrome but MRI reveals the conus to be above the L2 level. Clinical evaluation may include a simple rectal examination and may also include invasive or non-invasive urological examination. "Bladder dysfunction occurs in ~40% of patients affected by tethered cord syndrome. ... [I]t may be the earliest sign of the syndrome."

For children younger than eight weeks of age (and possibly in utero), a tethered cord may be observed using ultrasonography. Ultrasonography may still be useful through age 5 in limited circumstances.

MRI imaging is another method for helping diagnose a tethered cord. For tethered cord, MRIs have been shown to have both good sensitivity and specificity. A tethered cord is often diagnosed as a "low conus". The conus medullaris (or lower termination of the spinal cord) normally terminates at or above the L1-2 disk space (where L1 is the first, or topmost lumbar vertebra). After about 3 months of age, a conus below the L1-2 disk space may indicate a tethered cord and termination below L3-4 is unmistakably tethered. Cord tethering is often assumed when the conus is below the normal L2-3 level. Other features associated with tethered cord on imaging include a thickened filum terminale, a spinal lipoma extending through the dura into the subcutaneous fat, or adhesion of the neural placode to the dura or adjacent soft tissues.

== Treatment ==
Because neurological deficits are generally irreversible, early surgery is recommended when symptoms begin to worsen. In children, early surgery is recommended to prevent further neurological deterioration, including but not limited to chronic urinary incontinence.

In adults, surgery to detether (free) the spinal cord can reduce the size and further development of cysts in the cord and may restore some function or alleviate other symptoms. Although detethering is the common surgical approach to TCS, another surgical option for adults is a spine-shortening vertebral osteotomy. A vertebral osteotomy aims to indirectly relieve the excess tension on the spinal cord by removing a portion of the spine, shortening it. This procedure offers a unique benefit in that the spinal cord remains fixated to the spine, preventing retethering and spinal cord injury as possible surgical complications. However, its complexity and limited "track record" presently keeps vertebral osteotomies reserved as an option for patients who have failed in preventing retethering after detethering procedure(s).

Other treatment is symptomatic and supportive. Medications such as NSAIDs, opiates, synthetic opiates, COX-2 inhibitors, and off-label applications of tricyclic antidepressants combined with anti-seizure compounds have yet to prove they are of value in treatment of this affliction's pain manifestations. There is anecdotal evidence that TENS units may benefit some patients.

Treatment may be needed in adults who, while previously asymptomatic, begin to experience pain, lower back degeneration, scoliosis, neck and upper back problems and bladder control issues. Surgery on adults with minimal symptoms is somewhat controversial. For example, a website from the Columbia University Department of Neurosurgery says, "For the child that has reached adult height with minimal if any symptoms, some neurosurgeons would advocate careful observation only." However, surgery for those who have worsening symptoms is less controversial. If the only abnormality is a thickened, shortened filum, then a limited lumbosacral laminectomy with division of the filum may be sufficient to relieve the symptoms.

This syndrome was first noticed in the late 19th century. While information has been available for years, little widespread blind research has been done. More research has been called for, and doctors have conducted many studies with good results. There is a low morbidity rate, and no complications have been documented other than those typical of any type of back surgery. The association of this condition with others has been noticed, and needs further research to understand such relationships. TCS is causally linked to Chiari malformation and any affirmative diagnosis of TCS must be followed by screening for Chiari's several degrees. TCS may also be related to Ehlers–Danlos syndrome, or Klippel–Feil syndrome, which should also be screened for upon a positive TCS diagnosis. Spinal compression and the resulting relief is a known issue with this disorder. Like with the early-onset form, this disease form is linked to the Arnold–Chiari malformation, in which the brain is pulled or lowers into the top of the spine.

== Prognosis ==
The disorder progresses with age, but the aforementioned treatments can help prevent or sometimes relieve symptoms. With treatment, individuals with tethered spinal cord syndrome have a normal life expectancy. Studies have shown surgery can help improve low back pain, urinary symptoms, leg weakness, and walking distance. However, most neurological and motor impairments are irreversible.
