= Rachischisis =

Neural tube defect in which the spinal cord is exposed

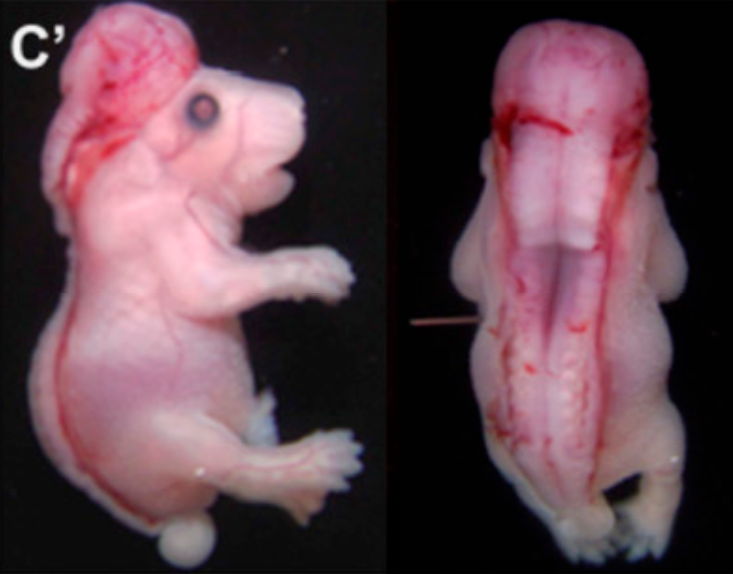
- Craniorachischisis in a mouse embryo at day 18.5
- Specialty: Medical genetics

Rachischisis (Greek: "rhachis - ῥάχις" - spine, and "schisis - σχίσις" - split) is a developmental birth defect involving the neural tube. This anomaly occurs in utero, when the posterior neuropore of the neural tube fails to close by the 27th intrauterine day. As a consequence the vertebrae overlying the open portion of the spinal cord do not fully form and remain unfused and open, leaving the spinal cord exposed. Patients with rachischisis have motor and sensory deficits, chronic infections, and disturbances in bladder function. This defect often occurs with anencephaly.

Craniorachischisis is a variant of rachischisis that occurs when the entire spinal cord and brain are exposed – simultaneous complete rachischisis and anencephaly. It is incompatible with life; affected pregnancies often end in miscarriage or stillbirth. Infants born alive with craniorachischisis die soon after birth.

== Presentation ==
=== Interactions with other developmental deformities ===
Rachischisis is a complex condition and presents itself along with other deformities. Other deformities are typically those of the face, neck, spine and head. It is extremely common for rachischisis to develop in conjunction with aplasia (a condition in which a tissue or organ does not develop fully).

Acrania is a developmental defect in which the bones with the cranial vault do not develop correctly and brain does not develop fully. Rachischisis can develop in conjunction with acrania, causing further damage to the brain and spinal regions. In the absence of acrania, patients with rachischisis still have a high mortality rate.

Anencephaly is a condition in which the baby develops with an open skull in some region. Rachischisis can develop in conjunction with anencephaly, increasing the amount of area that is exposed. Although these conditions closely resemble one another, cases of rachischisis are morphologically different from cases of anencephaly, so they are indeed two separate conditions.

Rachischisis is also a contributing factor to the onset of iniencephaly – a condition in which the spine is malformed.

Further abnormalities such as rib malformations can occur with rachischisis. Stomach deformities can also develop with rachischisis.

== Risk factors ==
If a sibling of the fetus has been affected by rachischisis, there is increased risk that another child will develop the condition. There is also a slightly higher chance that females will develop the condition over males.

Folate deficiency is also a well-accepted risk factor of all neural tube defects, including rachischisis. It is this reason that has caused many health policies regarding folic acid during pregnancy to be developed.

== Diagnosis ==
Initial diagnosis is typically by ultrasonography to reveal any congenital abnormalities. Fetuses affected typically show cranial abnormalities and deformities in brain tissue as well as spinal abnormalities. Following ultrasonography, magnetic resonance imaging (MRI) is commonly used to confirm the diagnosis. The presence of rachischisis is indicated in imaging by the absence of an arch-cranial line.

Other neural tube defect diagnostic tools such as assays of α-fetoprotein or acetylcholinesterase may also be helpful in determining any other conditions that can lead to development of rachischisis.

=== Classification ===
Rachischisis occurs most commonly in utero during the development of the child. Rachischisis is a neural tube defect characterised by a complete or severe defect in the spine. The defect can be located anywhere from the cervical region to the sacrum, or through the entire length of the spine. Typical defects are clefts or splits that open the spine to the exterior environment. Rachischisis occurs around 3–4 weeks after conception when the posterior neuropore of the neural tube does not close completely. It is a multifactorial aetiology and is most typically accompanied by other defects. Rachischisis is often described as a severe form of spina bifida, with the spine not only being exposed to the exterior environment, but with the opening being large enough to allow the neural plate to spread out of the opening and to the surface.

== Treatment ==
Rachischisis is a severe condition and survival rates for fetuses are extremely low. Babies that are born with the condition have high mortality rates and extreme developmental defects. Fetuses with the condition often spontaneously abort. Babies that are born with rachischisis are stillborn or die within a few hours to a few days of birth. Typically, medical termination of pregnancy is presented as an option to the mother once a diagnosis of rachischisis has been confirmed. As the condition is often accompanied by other deformities that not only need to be treated themselves, but also complicate the condition of rachischisis, it is difficult to treat fetuses affected. Treatments for neural tube defects such as spina bifida do not work as the child is not stable enough to receive them, or they are complicated by other accompanying conditions that have developed alongside rachischisis.

There has, however, been one reported successful treatment of rachischisis. The fetus was able to have the spinal shunt closed surgically. However, during this treatment several resuscitations were required and these caused trauma to the chest. Despite the closing of the shunt, extreme developmental inhibition was expected, and the prognosis was still extremely poor. This sparked questions as to whether this sort of treatment was ethical on fetuses. The fetus in this case had developed rachischisis without any indications of acrania. This is not typical of most cases, so this treatment would not be possible in the majority of cases of the condition. Due to the lack of treatments available for rachischisis, there is a focus on prevention of the disease. Folate supplementation is recommended before conception (if possible) and through to early pregnancy. There are many products on the market to assist with this. Products marketed towards reducing the risk of spina bifida and other neural tube defects are recommended to reduce the risk of rachischisis.

== See also ==
- Cranioschisis
