= Meningohydroencephalocoele =

- Specialty: Neurology

Meningohydroencephalocoele (AmE: meningohydroencephalocele) is a form of meningocele (AmE)—a developmental abnormality of the central nervous system.

Like meningocoele, meningohydroencephalocoele is caused by defects in bone ossification; in particular, the intramembranous ossification related to the closure of infantile fontanelles. It refers to the protrusion of the meninges between the un-fused bones, to lie subcutaneously.

- Meningocoele - refers to herniation of meninges.
- Meningoencephalocoele refers to the condition if brain tissue is included with the meninges in the herniation.
- Meningohydroencephalocoele refers to the condition including meninges, brain tissue and part of the ventricular system in the herniation.

Encephalocoele defects occur in approximately 1 in 2000 live births.
