= Butterfly vertebra =

Anomalous vertebral body

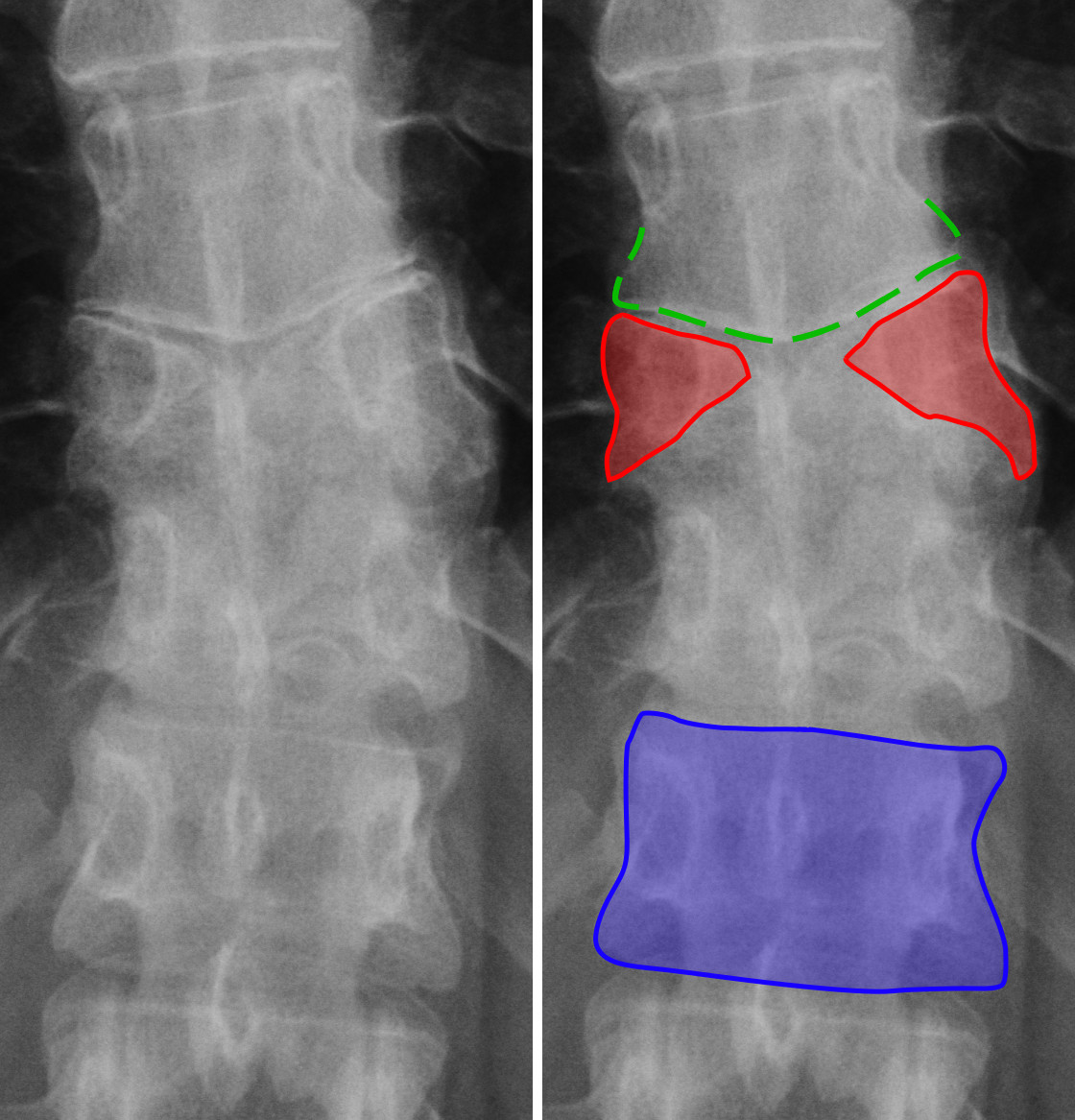
Butterfly vertebrae (red) and the subsequent deformation of the neighboring vertebra (green) in comparison to a normal vertebra (blue)

Butterfly vertebra (also known as sagittal cleft vertebra) is a rare congenital spinal anomaly characterized by the presence of a sagittal cleft within a vertebral body, giving it a butterfly-like appearance on imaging. This condition arises due to incomplete fusion of the lateral halves of a vertebra during embryonic development. While often asymptomatic, butterfly vertebrae may occasionally be associated with spinal deformities or syndromic conditions.

== Pathogenesis ==
The vertebral column develops from paired somites during embryogenesis. Normally, the right and left halves of each vertebra fuse in the midline to form a complete vertebral body. In butterfly vertebrae, this process is disrupted, leading to a persistent sagittal cleft. The defect is usually filled with fibrous or cartilaginous tissue, and the two halves of the vertebral body may remain connected by this intervening soft tissue. The condition is most commonly observed in the thoracic and lumbar spine, although it can occur at any spinal level. The degree of clefting varies, resulting in a spectrum of appearances on imaging studies.

== Radiological imaging ==
Plain Radiography: The vertebra appears divided into two symmetrical halves, separated by a vertical lucency that represents the cleft. The lateral portions of the vertebral body often appear sclerotic, and the shape resembles a butterfly when viewed in the anteroposterior projection.

CT imaging: Provides greater detail regarding the bony anatomy, including the extent of clefting and the composition of the intervening tissue.

MRI: Useful for evaluating associated spinal cord abnormalities or adjacent soft tissue changes. The sagittal cleft may appear as a hyperintense signal on T2-weighted images, representing cartilaginous or fibrous material.
