= Cranioschisis =

Neural tube defect in which the brain is exposed

- Specialty: Neurology

Cranioschisis (Greek: κρανιον kranion, "skull", and σχίσις schisis, "split") is a skull-related neural tube defect. The skull does not close all the way in this deformity (especially at the occipital region). As a result, the amniotic fluid enters the brain, leading to eventual brain degeneration and anencephaly. Craniorachischisis is on the extreme end of the dysraphism spectrum, wherein the entire length of the neural tube fails to close.

== See also ==
- Rachischisis
- Spina bifida
