= Congenital dermal sinus =

Birth defect; indentation along the spine and base of the skull

- Other names: Spinal congenital dermal sinus
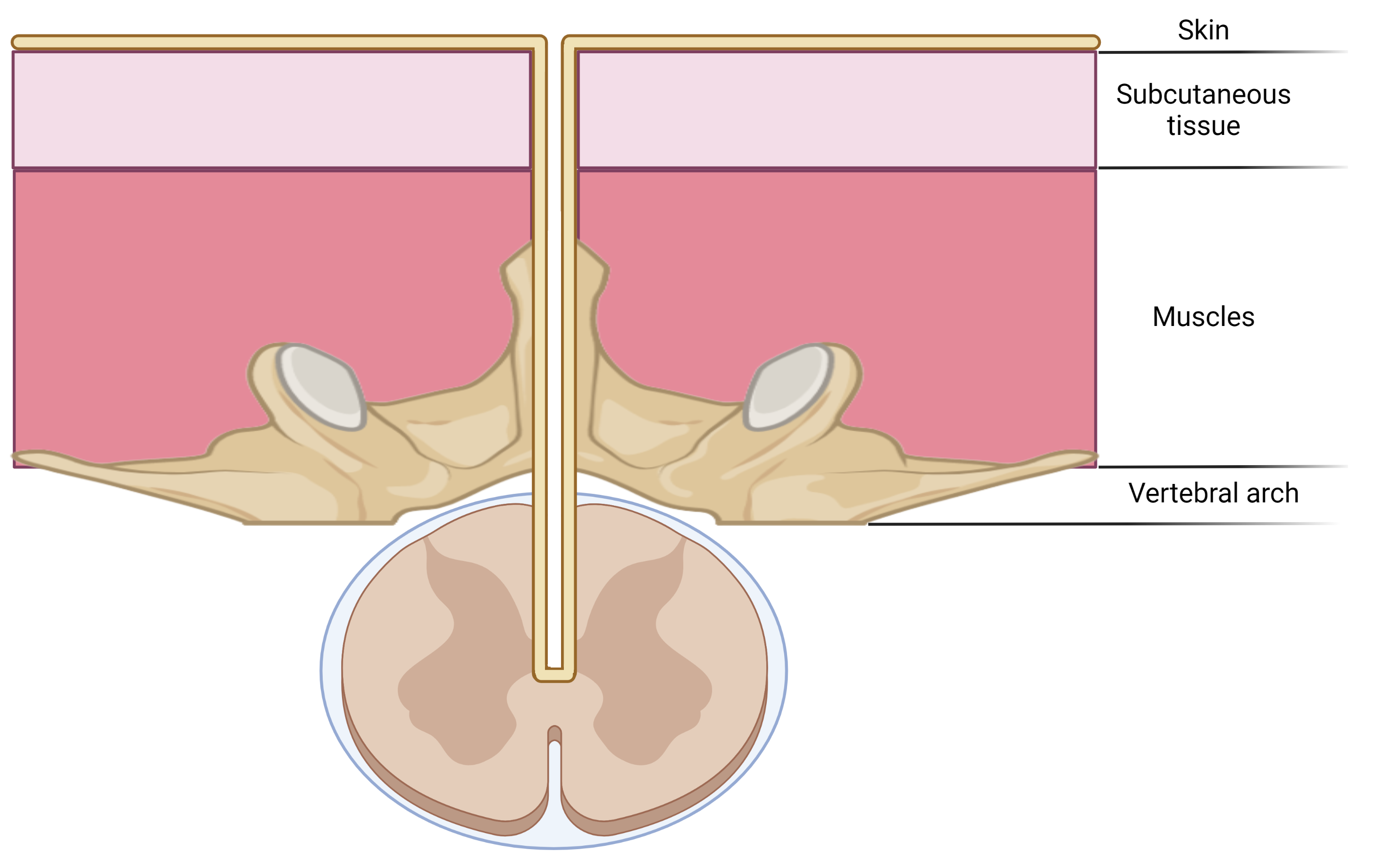
- The schematic representation of a dermal tract as a predisposing factor for intramedullary spinal cord abscesses.

Congenital dermal sinus is an uncommon form of cranial or spinal dysraphism. It occurs in 1 in 2500 live births. It occurs as a dermal indentation, found along the midline of the neuraxis and often presents alongside infection and neurological deficit. Congenital dermal sinus form due to a focal failure of dysjunction between the cutaneous ectoderm and neuroectoderm during the third to eight week of gestation. Typically observed in the lumbar and lumbosacral region, congenital dermal sinus can occur from the nasion and occiput region down.

Early diagnosis and treatment is crucial for cases of congenital dermal sinus. It ensures that neurological condition does not degrade and prevents infection. Diagnosis can be confirmed through the use of advanced neuroimaging to observe the tract and associated lesions.

== Embryogenesis ==
During normal development, cutaneous ectoderm separates from neuroectoderm to allow for the insertion of mesoderm. That is, the skin separates from the tissue of the spinal cord to allow proper formation of the vertebral column. In cases of congenital dermal sinus there is a failure in this process, resulting in formation of a persistent connection between the skin and neural tissue. This manifests as a tract extending from the surface of the skin to the spinal cord lined with stratified squamous epithelium, surrounded by dermal and neurological tissue. The tract may terminate in the deep fascia, or even make contact with neural elements. Congenital dermal sinus may form at any point along the midline of the neuraxis, however, the majority form in the lumbar and lumbosacral region (41% and 35% of cases respectively).

== Diagnosis ==
Congenital dermal sinus is often diagnosed in infants and children. Early diagnosis is important in congenital dermal sinus, so that treatment can be provided early, to prevent progression of associated complications.

=== Cutaneous abnormalities ===
Congenital dermal sinus is a tract from the surface layer of the skin, through the deeper tissues into the cranial or spinal cavity. The skin findings of this tract can include:

- Pit along neuraxis
- Flat capillary hemangioma
- Hypertrichosis
- Skin tag
- Abnormal pigmentation
- Subcutaneous lipoma
- Signs of local infection

=== Infection ===
The stratified squamous epithelium of the congenital dermal sinus tract can extend to the spinal fascia of the dura mater or all the way to the spinal cord. Thus, the congenital dermal sinus forms a point of entry for infection, this can allow for the formation of an abscess, especially among children. Infection can then travel up the spinal cord to result in meningitis, which can be fatal if left untreated.

=== Neurological deficit ===
Congenital dermal sinus is often also associated with spinal fluid drainage, intradural cysts and spinal cord tethering; conveying neurological deficit. Neurological deficit can occur due to spinal cord compression from intradural dermoid cyst growth in the epidermis and dermis. Tethered spinal cord can result in gait difficulties and sphincter dysfunction, as well as compressing the spine. Neurological deficits are more likely to occur where diagnosis has not been timely, allowing cysts and or infection.

=== Imaging ===
Magnetic Resonance Imaging (MRI) is the preferred tool for diagnostic and preoperative imaging of congenital dermal sinus. MRI allows the neural structures to be observed, visualizing the tract and its anomalies and lesions. For example, exposing tethered cord, inclusion tumors or spinal cord malformations. Observation by X-ray is limited in diagnosis, especially due to immature calcification of infants less than 18 months. X-ray may be used in conjunction with MRI or sonogram images to assist preoperatively.

== Treatment ==
Treatment of congenital dermal sinus involves complete resection of the tract as well as intradural exploration. Prophylactic surgical removal of the congenital dermal sinus tract is beneficial for the patient, allowing neurological and bladder function to be maintained. Early surgical intervention results decreases the risk of infection and/or tumour progression – factors typically associated with delayed presentation of congenital dermal sinus. ] Intradural exploration is necessary as excision of the entire tract, as well as any of its intradural connections, reduces need for further surgical intervention.

The surgical technique involves ‘removing the cutaneous lesion in ellipse’. The tract of the congenital dermal sinus must then be explored and excised, with intradural lesions dissected. If not all epithelial tissue is removed, there is a possibility for the dermoid cyst to reoccur and require further operation. Further operations are limited by postoperative and post-infection scarring.

== History ==
Prior to pervasive use and availability of advanced methods of neuroimaging, it is possible that the rate of incidence of congenital dermal sinus has been supplemented by the incidence of coccygeal pits. Coccygeal pits are distinct from congenital dermal sinus as they are found within the gluteal cleft, rather than above the gluteal cleft. The caudally orientated coccygeal pits are not associated with intradural pathology and do not need to be excised, unlike the cephalically oriented tracts of the congenital dermal sinus which confer great intradural pathology and require surgical intervention. While coccygeal pits occur in 4% of neonate population, congenital dermal sinus is only found in 1 in 2500 live births.
