= Spina bifida =

Birth defect of the spinal cord

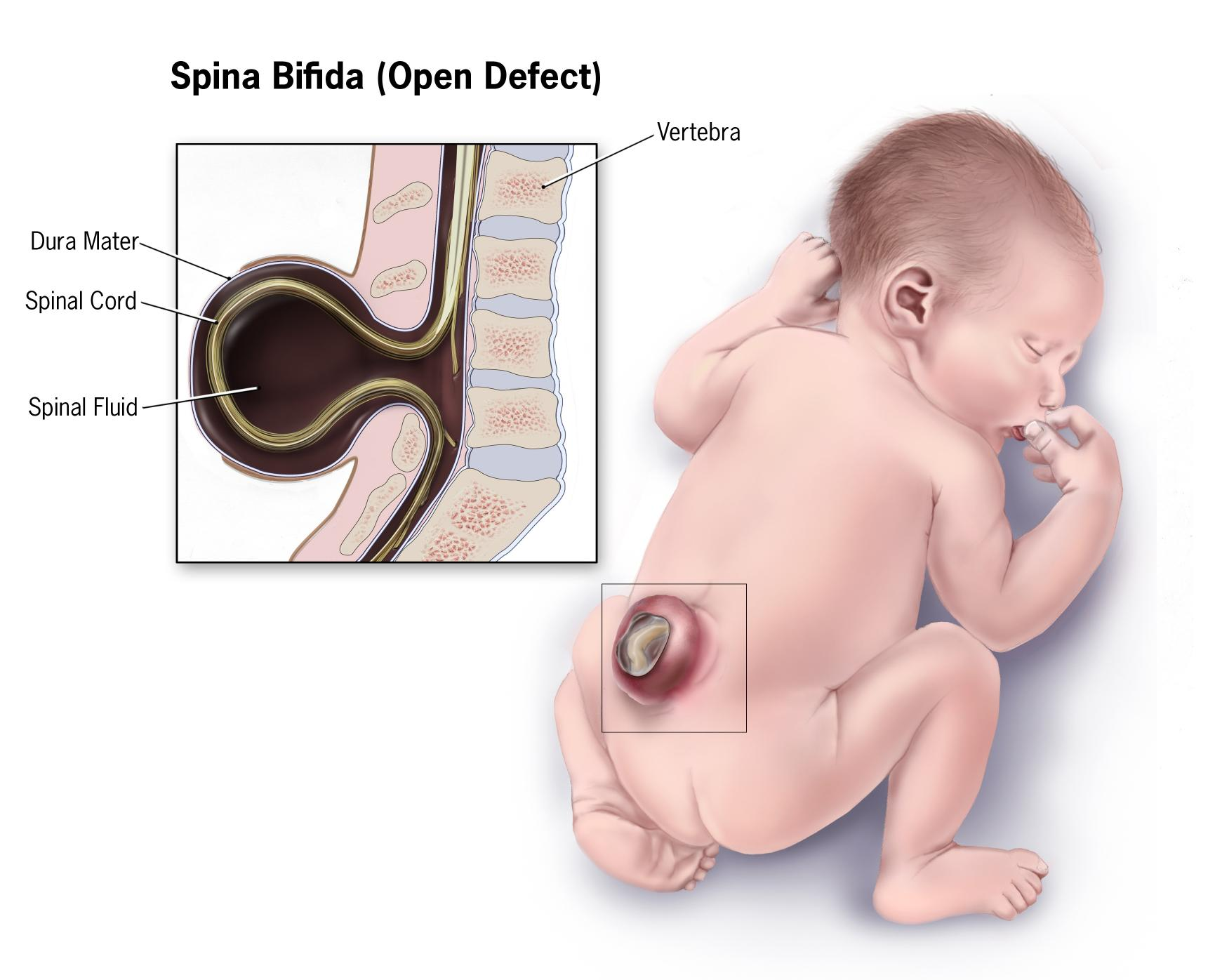
- Illustration of a child with spina bifida
- Specialty: Pediatrics, neurosurgery, rehabilitation medicine
- Symptoms: Hairy patch, dimple, dark spot, swelling on the lower back
- Complications: Poor ability to walk, problems with bladder or bowel control, hydrocephalus, tethered spinal cord, latex allergy
- Causes: Genetic and environmental factors
- Risk factors: Lack of folate during pregnancy, certain antiseizure medications, obesity, poorly controlled diabetes
- Diagnostic method: Amniocentesis, medical imaging
- Prevention: Folate supplementation
- Treatment: Surgery
- Frequency: 15% (occulta), 0.1–5 per 1000 births (others)

Spina bifida (SB; /ˈspaɪnə ˈbɪfɪdə/; Latin for 'split spine') is a birth defect in which there is incomplete closing of the spine and the membranes around the spinal cord during early development in pregnancy. There are three main types: spina bifida occulta, meningocele and myelomeningocele. Meningocele and myelomeningocele may be collectively referred to as spina bifida cystica (also called spina bifida aperta) due to the protrusion of the spinal cord and/or meninges through defects in the vertebral arches, resulting in a meningeal cyst. The most common location is the lower back, but in rare cases it may be in the middle back or neck.

Occulta has no or only mild signs, which may include a hairy patch, dimple, dark spot or swelling on the back at the site of the gap in the spine, while cystica shows clear external meningeal cyst from the protrusion of the meninges and cerebrospinal fluid. Meningocele typically causes mild problems, with a sac of fluid present at the gap in the spine. Myeloschisis, also known as open spina bifida, is the most severe form. This occurs when the spinal cord in the affected area is exposed to the environment due to failure of neural folds and overlying skin to fuse. Problems associated with this form include poor ability to walk, impaired bladder or bowel control, accumulation of fluid in the brain, a tethered spinal cord and latex allergy, and usually results in permanent paralysis or weakness of the lower limbs. Some experts believe such an allergy can be caused by frequent exposure to latex, which is common for people with spina bifida who have shunts and have had many surgeries. Learning problems are relatively uncommon.

Spina bifida is believed to be due to a combination of genetic and environmental factors. After having one child with the condition, or if one of the parents has the condition, there is a 4% chance that the next child will also be affected. Not having enough folate (vitamin B_{9}) in the diet before and during pregnancy also plays a significant role. Other risk factors include certain antiseizure medications, obesity and poorly controlled diabetes. Diagnosis may occur either before or after a child is born. Before birth, if a blood test or amniocentesis finds a high level of alpha-fetoprotein (AFP), there is a higher risk of spina bifida. Ultrasound examination may also detect the problem. Medical imaging can confirm the diagnosis after birth. Spina bifida is a type of neural tube defect related to but distinct from other types such as anencephaly and encephalocele.

Most cases of spina bifida can be prevented if the mother gets enough folate before and during pregnancy. Adding folic acid to flour has been found to be effective for most women. Open spina bifida can be surgically closed before or after birth. A shunt may be needed in those with hydrocephalus, and a tethered spinal cord may be surgically repaired. Devices to help with movement such as crutches or wheelchairs may be useful. Urinary catheterization may also be needed. In addition to the medical and surgical treatment options, physical therapy interventions may be implemented to treat complications of spina bifida, such as neurogenic bladder. Physical therapists may implement techniques such as electrical stimulation, which have been shown to improve bladder compliance and reduce detrusor muscle pressure in those with spina bifida. Additionally, pelvic floor physical therapy can facilitate neuromuscular re-education and improve bladder control by supporting continence and reducing urinary symptoms. Physical therapy offers a less invasive approach to improving overall bladder function.

Rates of other types of spina bifida vary significantly by country, from 0.1 to 5 per 1,000 births. On average, in developed countries, including the United States, it occurs in about 0.4 per 1,000 births. In India, it affects about 1.9 per 1,000 births. Europeans are at higher risk compared to Africans.

== Types ==
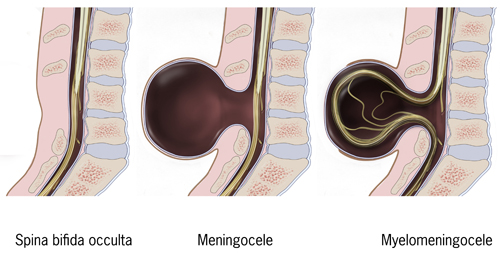
Different types of spina bifida

=== Spina bifida occulta ===
Occulta is Latin for 'hidden'. This is the mildest form of spina bifida. In occulta, the outer part of some of the vertebrae is not completely closed. The splits in the vertebrae are so small that the spinal cord does not protrude. The skin at the site of the lesion may be normal, or it may have some hair growing from it; there may be a dimple in the skin, or a birthmark. Unlike most other types of neural tube defects, spina bifida occulta is not associated with increased AFP, a common screening tool used to detect neural tube defects in utero. This is because, unlike in most of the other neural tube defects, the dural lining is maintained.

Many people with this type of spina bifida do not even know they have it, as the condition is asymptomatic in most cases. A systematic review of radiographic research studies found no relationship between spina bifida occulta and back pain. More recent studies not included in the review support the negative findings.

However, other studies suggest spina bifida occulta is not always harmless. One study found that among patients with back pain severity is worse if spina bifida occulta is present.

Incomplete posterior fusion is not a true spina bifida and is very rarely of neurological significance.

=== Meningocele ===
Frontoethmoidal encephalomeningocele, Siriraj Hospital

A posterior meningocele (/mɪˈnɪŋɡəˌsiːl/) or meningeal cyst (/mɪˈnɪndʒiəl/) is the least common form of spina bifida. In this form, a single developmental defect allows the meninges to herniate between the vertebrae. As the nervous system remains undamaged, individuals with meningocele are unlikely to have long-term health problems, although cases of tethered cord have been reported. Causes of meningocele include teratoma and other tumors of the sacrococcyx and of the presacral space, and Currarino syndrome.

A meningocele may also form through dehiscences in the base of the skull. These may be classified by their localisation as occipital, frontoethmoidal or nasal. Endonasal meningoceles lie at the roof of the nasal cavity and may be mistaken for a nasal polyp. They are treated surgically. Encephalomeningoceles are classified in the same way and also contain brain tissue.

=== Myelomeningocele ===
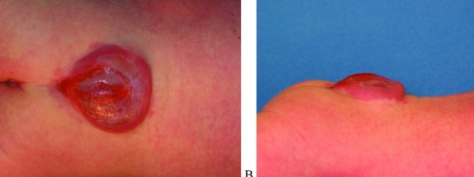
A lumbar myelomeningocele

Myelomeningocele (MMC), also known as meningomyelocele, is the type of spina bifida that often results in the most severe complications and affects the meninges and nerves. In individuals with myelomeningocele, the unfused portion of the spinal column allows the spinal cord to protrude through an opening. Myelomeningocele occurs in the third week of embryonic development, during neural tube pore closure. MMC is a failure of this to occur completely. The meningeal membranes that cover the spinal cord also protrude through the opening, forming a sac enclosing the spinal elements, such as meninges, cerebrospinal fluid, and parts of the spinal cord and nerve roots. Myelomeningocele is also associated with club foot deformity, and Arnold–Chiari malformation, necessitating a VP shunt placement.

Toxins and conditions associated with MMC formation include: calcium-channel blockers, carbamazepine, cytochalasins, hyperthermia, and valproic acid.

==== Myelocele ====
Spina bifida with myelocele is the most severe form of myelomeningocele. In this type, the involved area is represented by a flattened, plate-like mass of nervous tissue with no overlying membrane. The exposure of these nerves and tissues make the baby more prone to life-threatening infections such as meningitis.

The protruding portion of the spinal cord and the nerves that originate at that level of the cord are damaged or not properly developed. As a result, there is usually some degree of paralysis and loss of sensation below the level of the spinal cord defect. Thus, the more cranial the level of the defect, the more severe the associated nerve dysfunction and resultant paralysis may be. Symptoms may include ambulatory problems, loss of sensation, deformities of the hips, knees or feet, and loss of muscle tone.

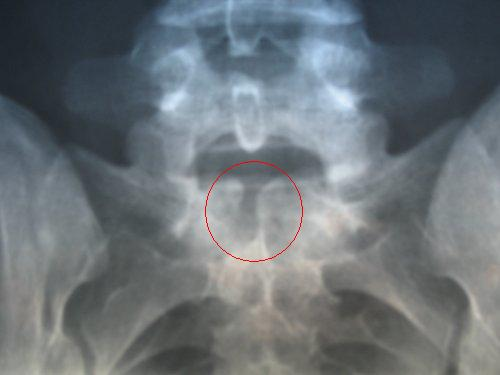
X-ray image of spina bifida occulta in S-1

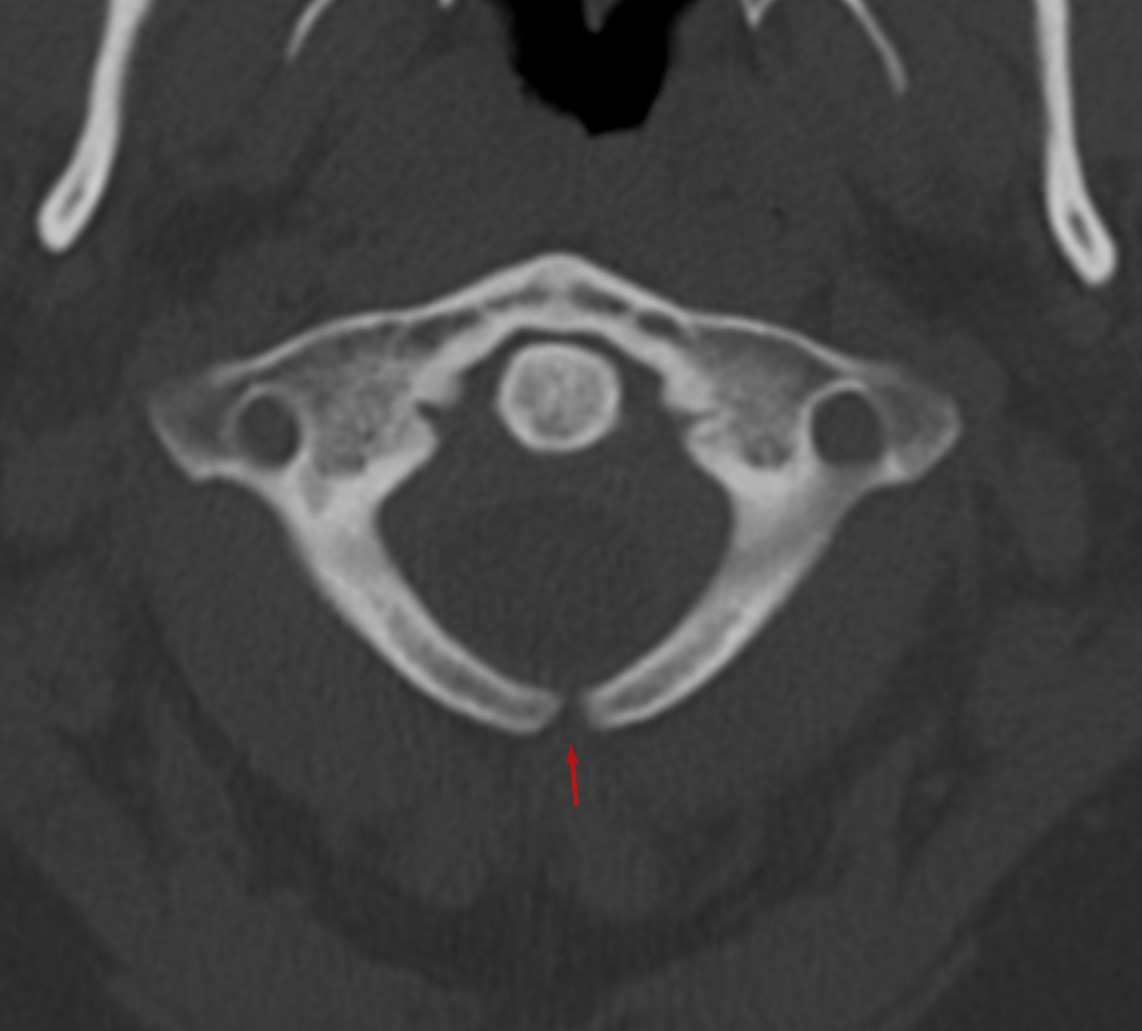
X-ray computed tomography scan of unfused arch at C1

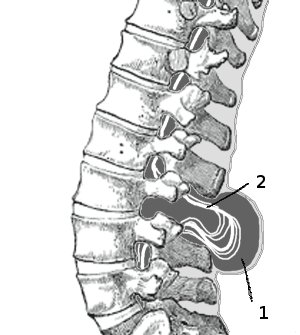
Myelomeningocele in the lumbar area
(1) External sac with cerebrospinal fluid
(2) Spinal cord wedged between the vertebrae

== Signs and symptoms ==
=== Physical problems ===
Physical signs of spina bifida may include:

- Leg weakness and paralysis
- Orthopedic abnormalities (i.e., club foot, hip dislocation, scoliosis)
- Bladder and bowel control problems, including incontinence, urinary tract infections, and poor kidney function
- Pressure sores and skin irritations
- Abnormal eye movement

68% of children with spina bifida have an allergy to latex, ranging from mild to life-threatening. The common use of latex in medical facilities makes this a particularly serious concern. The most common approach to avoid developing an allergy is to avoid contact with latex-containing products such as examination gloves and catheters that do not specify they are latex-free, and many other products, such as some commonly used by dentists.

The spinal cord lesion or the scarring due to surgery may result in a tethered spinal cord. In some individuals, this causes significant traction and stress on the spinal cord and can lead to a worsening of associated paralysis, scoliosis, back pain, and worsening bowel and/or bladder function.

=== Neurological problems ===
Many individuals with spina bifida have an associated abnormality of the cerebellum, called the Arnold Chiari II malformation. In affected individuals, the back portion of the brain is displaced from the back of the skull down into the upper neck. In about 90% of the people with myelomeningocele, hydrocephalus also occurs because the displaced cerebellum interferes with the normal flow of cerebrospinal fluid, causing an excess of the fluid to accumulate. In fact, the cerebellum also tends to be smaller in individuals with spina bifida, especially for those with higher lesion levels.

The corpus callosum is abnormally developed in 70–90% of individuals with spina bifida myelomeningocele; this affects the communication processes between the left and right brain hemispheres. Further, white matter tracts connecting posterior brain regions with anterior regions appear less organized. White matter tracts between frontal regions have also been found to be impaired.

Cortex abnormalities may also be present. For example, frontal regions of the brain tend to be thicker than expected, while posterior and parietal regions are thinner. Thinner sections of the brain are also associated with increased cortical folding. Neurons within the cortex may also be displaced.

==== Executive function ====
Several studies have demonstrated difficulties with executive functions in youth with spina bifida, with greater deficits observed in youth with shunted hydrocephalus. Unlike typically developing children, youths with spina bifida do not tend to improve in their executive functioning as they grow older. Specific areas of difficulty in some individuals include planning, organizing, initiating, and working memory. Problem-solving, abstraction, and visual planning may also be impaired. Further, children with spina bifida may have poor cognitive flexibility. Although executive functions are often attributed to the frontal lobes of the brain, individuals with spina bifida have intact frontal lobes; therefore, other areas of the brain may be implicated.

Individuals with spina bifida, especially those with shunted hydrocephalus, often have attention problems. Children with spina bifida and shunted hydrocephalus have higher rates of ADHD than children without those conditions (31% vs. 17%). Deficits have been observed for selective attention and focused attention, although poor motor speed may contribute to poor scores on tests of attention. Attention deficits may be evident at a very early age, as infants with spina bifida lag behind their peers in orienting to faces.

==== Academic skills ====
Individuals with spina bifida may struggle academically, especially in the subjects of mathematics and reading. In one study, 60% of children with spina bifida were diagnosed with a learning disability. In addition to brain abnormalities directly related to various academic skills, achievement is likely affected by impaired attentional control and executive functioning. Children with spina bifida may perform well in elementary school, but begin to struggle as academic demands increase.

Children with spina bifida are more likely than their peers without spina bifida to be dyscalculic. Individuals with spina bifida have demonstrated stable difficulties with arithmetic accuracy and speed, mathematical problem-solving, and general use and understanding of numbers in everyday life. Mathematics difficulties may be directly related to the thinning of the parietal lobes (regions implicated in mathematical functioning) and indirectly associated with deformities of the cerebellum and midbrain that affect other functions involved in mathematical skills. Further, higher numbers of shunt revisions are associated with poorer mathematics abilities. Working memory and inhibitory control deficiencies have been implicated for math difficulties, although visual-spatial difficulties are not likely involved. Early intervention to address mathematics difficulties and associated executive functions is crucial.

Individuals with spina bifida tend to have better reading skills than mathematics skills. Children and adults with spina bifida have stronger abilities in reading accuracy than in reading comprehension. Comprehension may be especially impaired for text that requires an abstract synthesis of information rather than a more literal understanding. Individuals with spina bifida may have difficulty with writing due to deficits in fine motor control and working memory.

== Cause ==
Spina bifida is believed to be caused by a combination of genetic and environmental factors. The genetic component is estimated at 60–70%, but few causative genes have been identified, despite much information gathered from mouse models. After having one child with the condition, or if a parent has the condition, there is a 4% chance the next child will also be affected. A folic acid deficiency during pregnancy also plays a significant role. Other risk factors include certain antiseizure medications, obesity, and poorly managed diabetes. Alcohol misuse can trigger macrocytosis which discards folate. After stopping the drinking of alcohol, a time period of months is needed to rejuvenate bone marrow and recover from the macrocytosis.

Certain mutations in the gene VANGL1 have been linked with spina bifida in some families with a history of the condition.

== Pathophysiology ==
Spina bifida occurs when local regions of the neural tube fail to fuse or there is failure in formation of the vertebral neural arches. Neural arch formation occurs in the first month of embryonic development (often before the mother knows she is pregnant). Some forms are known to occur with primary conditions that cause raised central nervous system pressure, raising the possibility of a dual pathogenesis.

In normal circumstances, the closure of the neural tube occurs around the 23rd (rostral closure) and 27th (caudal closure) day after fertilization. However, if something interferes and the tube fails to close properly, a neural tube defect will occur.

Maternal diabetes, anti-seizure medication use, and obesity are known risk factors for the development of spina bifida.

Extensive evidence from mouse strains with spina bifida indicates that there is sometimes a genetic basis for the condition. Human spina bifida likely results from the interaction of multiple genes and environmental factors.

Research has shown the lack of folic acid (folate) is a contributing factor in the pathogenesis of neural tube defects, including spina bifida. Supplementation of the mother's diet with folate can reduce the incidence of neural tube defects by about 70%, and can also decrease the severity of these defects when they occur. It is unknown how or why folic acid has this effect.

Spina bifida does not follow direct patterns of heredity as do muscular dystrophy or haemophilia. Studies show a woman having had one child with a neural tube defect such as spina bifida has about a 3% risk of having another affected child. This risk can be reduced with folic acid supplementation before pregnancy.

== Prevention ==
There is neither a single cause of spina bifida nor any known way to prevent it entirely. However, dietary supplementation with folic acid has been shown to be helpful in reducing the incidence of spina bifida. Folate supplementation prior to conception has been found to reduce the risk of neural tube defects, including spina bifida, by 70%. Sources of folic acid include whole grains, fortified breakfast cereals, dried beans, leaf vegetables and fruits. However it is difficult for women to get the recommended 400 micrograms of folic acid a day from unfortified foods. Globally, fortified wheat flour and other cereal grains are credited with preventing 50,000–61,000 neural tube birth defects such as spina bifida yearly, which is estimated to be 22% of total possible preventable neural tube defects assuming universal and worldwide folic acid fortification. Many countries in Africa, Asia, and Europe have yet to implement fortification

Folate fortification of enriched grain products has been mandatory in the United States since 1998. This prevents an estimated 600 to 700 incidents of spina bifida a year in the U.S. and saves $400–600 million in healthcare expenses. The U.S. Food and Drug Administration, Public Health Agency of Canada and the UK Department of Health and Social Care (DHSC) recommended amount of folic acid for women of childbearing age and women planning to become pregnant is at least 0.4 mg/day of folic acid from at least three months before conception, and continued for the first 12 weeks of pregnancy. The United States Preventive Services Task Force (USPSTF) recommends all people who may become pregnant or are attempting pregnancy take a folic acid supplement containing 0.4–0.8 mg (400–800 mcg) of folic acid daily. Women who have already had a baby with spina bifida or other type of neural tube defect, or are taking anticonvulsant medication, should take a higher dose of 4–5 mg/day. However, the daily requirement of folate and the recommended folate blood levels to prevent neural tube defects are not well established.

== Screening ==
Tests are not 100% perfect, so even though screening results present negative, there is still a slight chance that spina bifida is present.

Spina bifida can usually be detected during the second trimester of pregnancy by fetal ultrasound. Increased levels of maternal serum alpha-fetoprotein (MSAFP) should be followed up by two tests – an ultrasound of the fetal spine and amniocentesis of the mother's amniotic fluid (to test for alpha-fetoprotein and acetylcholinesterase). AFP tests are now mandated by some state laws (including California) and failure to provide them can have legal ramifications. Spina bifida may be associated with other malformations as in dysmorphic syndromes, often resulting in spontaneous miscarriage. In the majority of cases, though, spina bifida is an isolated malformation.

Risks of amniocentesis, which may occur in approximately 1 in 900 tests, include leaking amniotic fluid, though this generally has no effect on pregnancy. However, second-trimester amniocentesis carries a slight risk of miscarriage of 0.1% to 0.3% when done by a skilled person using ultrasound, though research suggests that the risk of miscarriage is higher for amniocentesis done before 15 weeks of pregnancy. Infection transmission may occur from mother to child if the mother has infections such as hepatitis C, toxoplasmosis, or HIV/AIDS, or Rh sensitization, which ultimately damages the fetus' red blood cells. Needle injury to the fetus may occur, though serious injury is very rare, along with triggering a uterine infection, which is also very rare.

Genetic counseling and further genetic testing through amniocentesis may be offered during the pregnancy, as some neural tube defects are associated with genetic disorders such as trisomy 18. Ultrasound screening for spina bifida is partly responsible for the decline in new cases, because many pregnancies are terminated out of fear that a newborn might have a poor future quality of life. With modern medical care, the quality of life of patients has greatly improved.

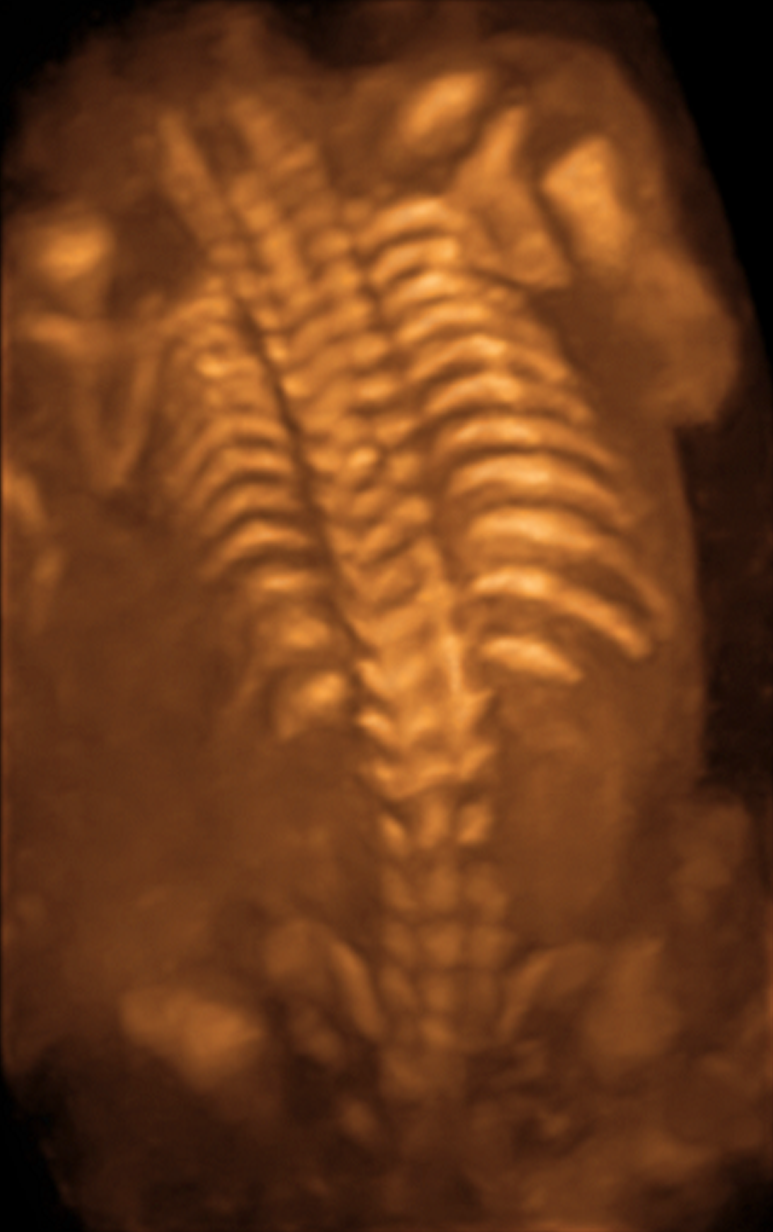
Three-dimensional ultrasound image of the fetal spine at 21 weeks of pregnancy

Ultrasound view of the fetal spine at 21 weeks of pregnancy. In the longitudinal scan a lumbar myelomeningocele is seen.

Anatomy scan of the fetal head at 20 weeks of pregnancy in a fetus affected by spina bifida. In the axial scan the characteristic lemon sign and banana sign are seen.

== Treatment ==
There is no known cure for the nerve damage caused by spina bifida. Standard treatment is surgery after delivery. This surgery aims to prevent further damage of the nervous tissue and to prevent infection; pediatric neurosurgeons operate to close the opening on the back. The spinal cord and its nerve roots are put back inside the spine and covered with meninges. In addition, a shunt may be surgically installed to provide a continuous drain for the excess cerebrospinal fluid produced in the brain, as happens with hydrocephalus. Shunts most commonly drain into the abdomen or chest wall. Along with medical and surgical management, those with spina bifida can require long-term multidisciplinary rehabilitation in order to address functional limitations and improve their quality of life. Individuals with spina bifida may also have challenges in mobility and functional independence due to neuromuscular and musculoskeletal impairments, which can make daily activities more difficult. Physical therapy plays an important role in that it can improve strength, mobility, and functioning.

=== Pregnancy ===
Standard treatment is after delivery. There is tentative evidence about treatment for severe disease before delivery while the baby is inside the womb. As of 2014, however, the evidence remains insufficient to determine benefits and harms.

Treatment of spina bifida during pregnancy is not without risk. To the mother, this includes scarring of the uterus. To the baby, there is the risk of preterm birth.

Broadly, there are two forms of prenatal treatment. The first is open fetal surgery, where the uterus is opened and the spina bifida repair performed. The second is via fetoscopy. These techniques may be an option to standard therapy.

=== Childhood ===
Most individuals with myelomeningocele will need periodic evaluations by a variety of specialists:

- Physiatrists coordinate the rehabilitation efforts of different therapists and prescribe specific therapies, adaptive equipment, or medications to encourage as high of a functional performance within the community as possible.
- Orthopedists monitor growth and development of bones, muscles, and joints.
- Neurosurgeons perform surgeries at birth and manage complications associated with tethered cord and hydrocephalus.
- Neurologists treat and evaluate nervous system issues, such as seizure disorders, (Babies start walking from 15 months of age, that is, at 1 and 3 months after birth).
- Urologists to address kidney, bladder, and bowel dysfunction – many will need to manage their urinary systems with a program of catheterization. Bowel management programs aimed at improving elimination are also designed.
- Colorectal specialists help restore bowel and urinary control and function.
- Ophthalmologists evaluate and treat complications of the eyes.
- Orthotists design and customize various types of assistive technology, including braces, crutches, walkers, and wheelchairs to aid in mobility. As a general rule, the higher the level of the spina bifida defect, the more severe the paralysis, but paralysis does not always occur. Thus, those with low levels may need only short leg braces, whereas those with higher levels do best with a wheelchair, and some may be able to walk unaided.
- Physical therapists, occupational therapists, psychologists, and speech/language pathologists aid in rehabilitative therapies and increase independent living skills.

=== Transition to adulthood ===
Although many children's hospitals feature integrated multidisciplinary teams to coordinate healthcare of youth with spina bifida, the transition to adult healthcare can be difficult because the above healthcare professionals operate independently of each other, requiring separate appointments, and communicate among each other much less frequently. Healthcare professionals working with adults may also be less knowledgeable about spina bifida because it is considered a childhood chronic health condition. Due to the potential difficulties of the transition, adolescents with spina bifida and their families are encouraged to begin to prepare for the transition around ages 14–16, although this may vary depending on the adolescent's cognitive and physical abilities and available family support. The transition itself should be gradual and flexible. The adolescent's multidisciplinary treatment team may aid in the process by preparing comprehensive, up-to-date documents detailing the adolescent's medical care, including information about medications, surgery, therapies, and recommendations. A transition plan and aid in identifying adult healthcare professionals are also helpful to include in the transition process.

Further complicating the transition process is the tendency for youths with spina bifida to be delayed in the development of autonomy, with boys particularly at risk for slower development of independence. An increased dependence on others (in particular family members) may interfere with the adolescent's self-management of health-related tasks, such as catheterization, bowel management, and taking medications. As part of the transition process, it is beneficial to begin discussions at an early age about educational and vocational goals, independent living, and community involvement.

Certain locations feature multidisciplinary clinics in order to offer coordinated care between specialists, such as Cincinnati Children's Center for Spina Bifida.

== Epidemiology ==
Rates of spina bifida vary significantly by country from 0.1 to 5 per 1000 births. In high income and upper-middle income countries with folate fortification of foodstuffs public health programs, including in North America, the incidence of spina bifida is 34–37 cases per 100,000 live births. In countries without folate fortification programs nor widespread maternal folate supplementation, the incidence is 54–87 cases per 100,000 live births. And in low income countries or regions without folic acid supplementation nor fortification, the incidence is 300 cases per 100,000 live births. In India, about 1.9 per 1000 live births are affected by spina bifida.

In the United States, rates are higher on the East Coast than on the West Coast, and higher in white people (one case per 1000 live births) than in black people (0.1–0.4 case per 1000 live births). Immigrants from Ireland have a higher incidence of spina bifida than do natives. Highest rates of the defect in the USA can be found in Hispanic youth.

The highest incidence rates worldwide were found in Ireland and Wales, where three to four cases of myelomeningocele per 1000 population have been reported during the 1970s, along with more than six cases of anencephaly (both live births and stillbirths) per 1000 population. The reported overall incidence of myelomeningocele in the British Isles was 2.0–3.5 cases per 1000 births. Since then, the rate has fallen dramatically with 0.15 per 1000 live births reported in 1998, though this decline is partially accounted for because some fetuses are aborted when tests show signs of spina bifida (see Pregnancy screening above).

== History ==
Although Hippocratic doctors were aware of developmental abnormalities involving the lower spine, the first person to describe a spinal spina bifida was the Persian physician Al-Razi (Rhazes, 865–925 CE). He gave the earliest accurate account of the morbid anatomy associated with spina bifida.

== Research ==
- 1980 – Fetal surgical techniques using animal models were first developed at the University of California, San Francisco by Michael R. Harrison, N. Scott Adzick and research colleagues.
- 1994 – A surgical model that simulates the human disease is the fetal lamb model of myelomeningocele (MMC) introduced by Meuli and Adzick in 1994. The MMC-like defect was surgically created at 75 days of gestation (term 145 to 150 days) by a lumbo-sacral laminectomy. Approximately 3 weeks after creation of the defect a reversed latissimus dorsi flap was used to cover the exposed neural placode and the animals were delivered by cesarean section just prior term. Human MMC-like lesions with similar neurological deficit were found in the control newborn lambs. In contrast, animals that underwent closure had near-normal neurological function and well-preserved cytoarchitecture of the covered spinal cord on histopathological examination. Despite mild paraparesis, they were able to stand, walk, perform demanding motor test and demonstrated no signs of incontinence. Furthermore, sensory function of the hind limbs was present clinically and confirmed electrophysiologically. Further studies showed that this model, when combined with a lumbar spinal cord myelotomy leads to the hindbrain herniation characteristic of the Chiari II malformation and that in utero surgery restores normal hindbrain anatomy by stopping the leak of cerebrospinal fluid through the myelomeningocele lesion.

Surgeons at Vanderbilt University, led by Joseph Bruner, attempted to close spina bifida in 4 human fetuses using a skin graft from the mother using a laparoscope. Four cases were performed before stopping the procedure – two of the four fetuses died.

- 1998 – N. Scott Adzick and team at The Children's Hospital of Philadelphia performed open fetal surgery for spina bifida in an early gestation fetus (22-week gestation fetus) with a successful outcome. Open fetal surgery for myelomeningocele involves surgically opening the pregnant mother's abdomen and uterus to operate on the fetus. The exposed fetal spinal cord is covered in layers with surrounding fetal tissue at mid-gestation (19–25 weeks) to protect it from further damage caused by prolonged exposure to amniotic fluid. Between 1998 and 2003, Dr. Adzick, and his colleagues in the Center for Fetal Diagnosis and Treatment at The Children's Hospital Of Philadelphia, performed prenatal spina bifida repair in 58 mothers and observed significant benefit in the babies.

Fetal surgery after 25 weeks has not shown benefit in subsequent studies.

=== MOMS trial ===
Management of myelomeningocele study (MOMS) was a phase III clinical trial designed to compare two approaches to the treatment of spina bifida: surgery before birth and surgery after birth.

The trial concluded that the outcomes after prenatal spina bifida treatment are improved to the degree that the benefits of the surgery outweigh the maternal risks. This conclusion requires a value judgment on the relative value of fetal and maternal outcomes on which opinion is still divided.

To be specific, the study found that prenatal repair resulted in:

- Reversal of the hindbrain herniation component of the Chiari II malformation
- Reduced need for ventricular shunting (a procedure in which a thin tube is introduced into the brain's ventricles to drain fluid and relieve hydrocephalus)
- Reduced incidence or severity of potentially devastating neurologic effects caused by the spine's exposure to amniotic fluid, such as impaired motor function

At one year of age, 40 percent of the children in the prenatal surgery group had received a shunt, compared to 83 percent of the children in the postnatal group. During pregnancy, all the fetuses in the trial had hindbrain herniation. However, at age 12 months, one-third (36 percent) of the infants in the prenatal surgery group no longer had any evidence of hindbrain herniation, compared to only 4 percent in the postnatal surgery group. Further surveillance is ongoing.

=== Fetoscopic surgery ===
In contrast to the open fetal operative approach performed in the MOMS trial, a minimally invasive fetoscopic approach (akin to 'keyhole' surgery) has been developed. This approach has been evaluated by independent authors of a controlled study which showed some benefit in survivors, but others are more skeptical.

The observations in mothers and their fetuses that were operated over the past two and a half years by the matured minimally invasive approach showed the following results: Compared to the open fetal surgery technique, fetoscopic repair of myelomeningocele results in far less surgical trauma to the mother, as large incisions of her abdomen and uterus are not required. In contrast, the initial punctures have a diameter of 1.2 mm only. As a result, thinning of the uterine wall or dehiscence which have been among the most worrisome and criticized complications after the open operative approach do not occur following minimally invasive fetoscopic closure of spina bifida aperta. The risks of maternal chorioamnionitis or fetal death as a result of the fetoscopic procedure run below 5%. Women are discharged home from hospital one week after the procedure. There is no need for chronic administration of tocolytic agents since postoperative uterine contractions are barely ever observed. The current cost of the entire fetoscopic procedure, including hospital stay, drugs, perioperative clinical, ECG, ultrasound and MRI-examinations, is approximately €16,000.

In 2012, these results of the fetoscopic approach were presented at various national and international meetings, among them at the 1st European Symposium "Fetal Surgery for Spina bifida" in April 2012 in Giessen, at the 15th Congress of the German Society for Prenatal Medicine and Obstetrics in May 2012 in Bonn, at the World Congress of the Fetal Medicine Foundation in June 2012 and at the World Congress of the International Society of Obstetrics and Gynecology (ISUOG) in Copenhagen in September 2012, and published in abstract form.

Since then more data has emerged. In 2014, two papers were published on fifty one patients. These papers suggested that the risk to the mother is small. The main risk appears to be preterm labour, on average at about 33 weeks.

=== Placenta ===
The placenta is a critical determinant of fetal growth, yet placental development has not been well studied in pregnancies with fetal neural tube defects. Folate bioavailability is associated not only with isolated fetal neural tube defects, but is also required for optimal placental development. Pregnancies with folate-responsive neural tube defects may thus be at increased risk for poor placental development. A study comprehensively assessing the prevalence of placental pathology in a large cohort of fetuses with isolated neural tube defects found that these fetuses had higher risk of placental pathology and altered offspring growth outcomes at birth compared to controls, suggesting increased risk of placental maldevelopment that may contribute to poor fetal growth in pregnancies with neural tube defects.

== See also ==
- Meningohydroencephalocoele
- Rachischisis
- Congenital dermal sinus
