= N. Scott Adzick =

American surgeon and academic

N. Scott Adzick (born May 14, 1953, in Omaha, Nebraska) currently serves as the Surgeon-in-Chief at Children’s Hospital of Philadelphia (CHOP) as well as the Director of CHOP’s Center for Fetal Diagnosis and Treatment, which he founded in 1995. Dr. Adzick is also the C. Everett Koop Professor of Pediatric Surgery at CHOP and a Professor of Pediatrics, Obstetrics and Gynecology at the Perelman School of Medicine at the University of Pennsylvania.

== Professional history ==
Adzick earned his bachelor's degree from Harvard College and his medical degree from Harvard Medical School. He completed his surgical training at Massachusetts General Hospital in Boston and his pediatric surgery fellowship at Boston Children’s Hospital. Adzick also holds a Masters of Medical Management degree from Carnegie Mellon University.

While at UCSF, as both a fellow and an attending surgeon, Adzick worked with Michael R. Harrison, and their other research colleagues, to develop some of the first fetal surgical techniques using animal models, and eventually clinical application.

In 1995, Adzick established the Center for Fetal Diagnosis and Treatment (CFDT) at Children’s Hospital of Philadelphia.

In 2015, Adzick appeared in PBS’s Twice Born: Stories from the Special Delivery Unit documentary mini-series about fetal surgery. On September 21, 2016, at the 37th Annual News and Documentary Emmy Awards, the National Academy of Television Arts & Sciences awarded PBS with an OUTSTANDING SCIENCE AND TECHNOLOGY PROGRAMMING Emmy for Twice Born.

== Research ==
Adzick was the principal investigator for the National Institutes of Health (NIH) "Management of Myelomeningocele Study" (MOMS) at Children’s Hospital of Philadelphia. Adzick is also the lead author of the study results, published in the New England Journal of Medicine.

Adzick has had NIH grant support for more than 30 years and has authored more than 500 peer-reviewed publications. He was elected to the Institute of Medicine of the National Academy of Science in 1998.
