= Giorgio Baglivi =

Croatian-Italian physician (1668–1707)

Giorgio Baglivi FRS
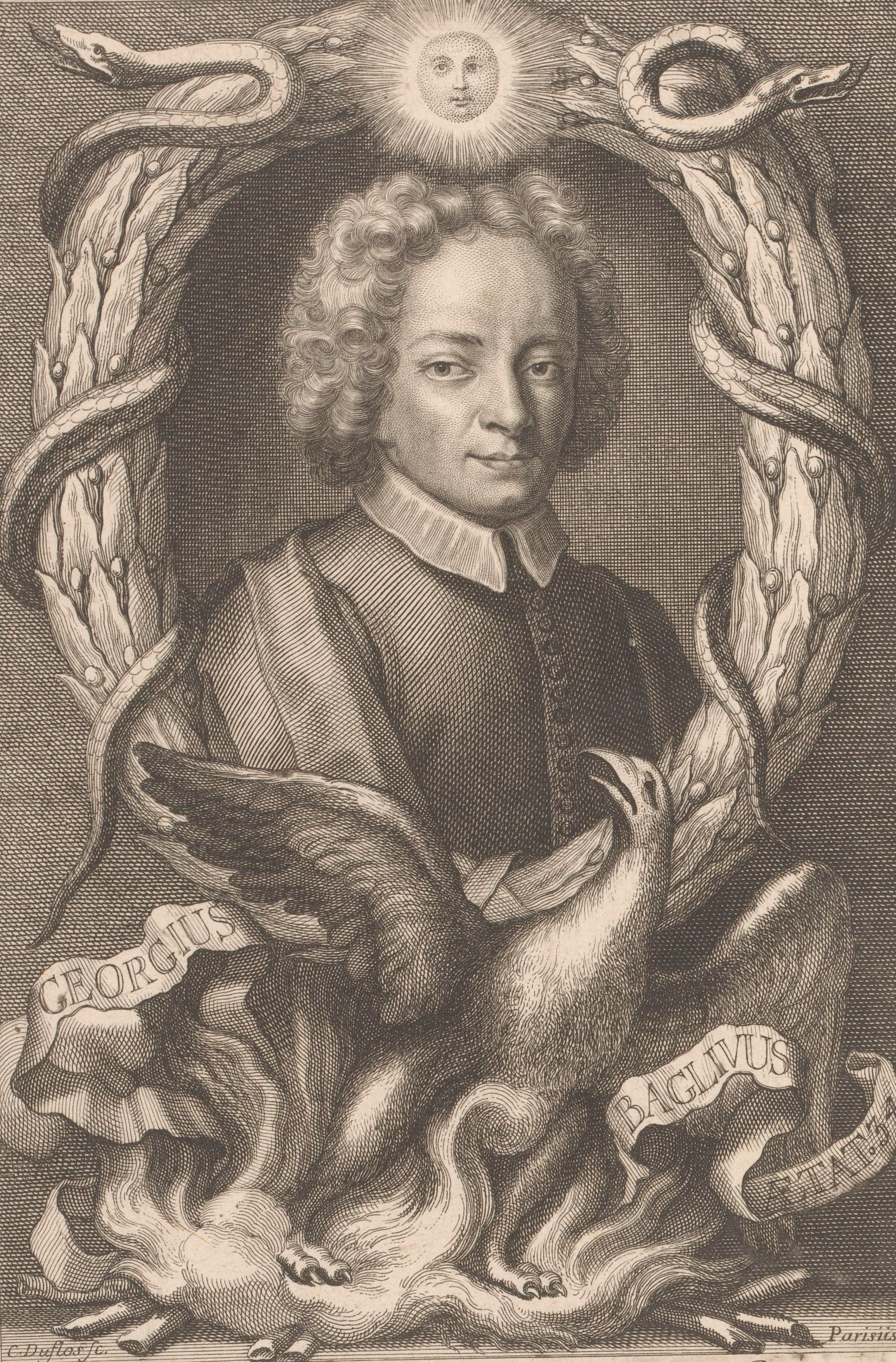
- Giorgio Baglivi
- Born: September 8, 1668; Ragusa, Republic of Ragusa (Dubrovnik, Croatia)
- Died: June 15, 1707 (aged 38); Rome, Papal States
- Scientific career
- Fields: Pathology

Giorgio Baglivi (Latin: Georgius Baglivus Armenius; (Note: Sometimes also given as Giorgius Baglivi.) Croatian: Gjuro/Đuro Baglivi; September 8, 1668 – June 15, 1707), born Giorgio Armeno and sometimes anglicized as George Baglivi, was a Croatian-Italian physician and scientist of Armenian origin. He made important contributions to clinical education, based on his own medical practice. His De Fibra Motrice advanced the "solidist" theory that the solid parts of organs are more crucial to their good functioning than their fluids, against the traditional belief in four humors. Baglivi, however, advocated against doctors relying on any general theory rather than careful observation. He was "a distinguished physiological researcher fascinated by the nerves, his microscopic studies enabled him to distinguish between smooth and striated muscles and distinct kinds of fibres."

== Life ==
Giorgio was born to Blasius Armeno and Anna de Lupis on September 8, 1668, in Ragusa (now Dubrovnik, Croatia). His mother was Croatian, while his father was possibly of Armenian descent (Note: Grmek considers it only probable that the father was of Armenian descent, based on the evidence of his surname.) His parents were respectable but poor merchants who both died in 1670, after the birth of Giorgio's younger brother Jacob (Latin: Jacobus). The brothers were originally raised by their uncle and educated at Ragusa's Jesuit college.

At 15, the brothers moved to Lecce in Apulia, where they took the name of his adoptive father, a wealthy physician named Pietro Angelo Baglivi. Giorgio studied first at the universities of Salerno, then successively at Padua and Bologna and possibly also Naples. He attended Lorenzo Bellini's lectures in Pisa and worked in hospitals in Padua and Venice, Florence, and Bologna and travelled to the Dutch Republic and England from 1688 to 1692. As early as 1685, Baglivi began experimenting with animals, injecting different substances into dogs' jugular veins and examining the life cycle of tarantulas. Between 1689 and 1691, he performed many autopsies and dissected animals including lions, deer, tortoises, and snakes. He studied dura mater through observing injured men and experimenting on dogs and also investigated toxic drugs. Observing discrepancies between his research and clinical practice, he criticized doctors for following theoretical systems slavishly instead of relying more strongly on observation. (This would later be the central theme of his 1696 book On Medical Practice.)

He served as an assistant to Marcello Malpighi in Bologna in 1691, and followed him to Rome the next year when Malpighi was named chief personal physician ("archiater") to the pope. Under Malpighi, Baglivi performed experiments on the circulation of blood in frogs; he also injected various medicines into dogs' veins and spinal canals and experimented on their pneumogastric nerves. He utilized a microscope to study the structure of muscles and the brain. Following Malpighi's death in 1694, Baglivi performed his autopsy and gave a thorough description of the cerebral apoplexy that killed him. While in Rome, he befriended Bellini, Lancisi, Redi, Tozzi, and Trionfetti. In 1695, he became second physician to Pope Innocent XIII and, in 1696, was elected professor of anatomy at the College of Sapienza. He received memberships in Rome's Academy of the Arcadians (1699) and the Tuscan Fisiocriti (1700). He continued as a personal physician to Clement XI and was named the Sapienza's professor of theoretical medicine in 1701. He continued his observations by microscope as professor of theoretical medicine at the Sapienza, as well as examining the properties of saliva, bile, and blood. His lectures, demonstrations, and consultations became famed across Europe: he was elected a Fellow of the Royal Society in England in July 1698, a member of the Holy Roman Empire's Academy of the Curious in 1699, and an "honorary member" of the French Academy. For a time he was surrounded in controversy following charges of plagiarism by Antonio Pacchioni, but Baglivi successfully defended the primacy of his own work.

He died in Rome on June 15, 1707.

== Works ==
Baglivi's writings bear strong similarities to Santorio Santorio and defend biomechanicism, making him one of the iatrophysicists. Being inclined towards mathematics and quantification in medicine, Baglivi viewed the physiological processes in mechanical terms, behaving like the parts of a machine. A collection of his Latin writings were published in quarto in 1704. (An octavo edition was printed in 1788) and were translated into Italian, French, German, and English. His personal correspondence in Latin and Italian is held at the National Central Library in Florence, Italy; the Waller Collection at the university library in Uppsala, Sweden; and at McGill University's Osler Library in Montreal, Quebec, Canada.

- De praxi medica ad priscam observandi rationem ravocanda (Rome, 1696; trans. as The Practice of Physick at London, 1704, British Library edition, 1723)
- De fibra motrice, et morbosa, nec non de experimentis, ac morbis salivae, bilis, et sanguinis (Perugia, 1700)
- Specimen quatuor libroum de fibra motrice et morbosa (Rome, 1702)
- Canones de medicina solidorum ad rectum statices usum (Rome, 1704)
- Opera omnia medico-practica et anatomica (Lyons, 1704; new enlarged ed., 1710; ed. by C.G. Kuhn at Leipzig, 1827-1828)
- De anatome, morsu et effectibus tarantulae, 1698. Anatomie, morsure et effets de la tarentule, Rome 1696, Geneva 1698, Paris 2022. Translated from Latin to French by Estela Bonnaffoux. Introduction by Andrea Carlino. Éditions Jérôme Millon. 256p. ISBN 9782841374052.

== Memory ==
In 1995, Croatian Academy of Sciences and Arts put up a bilingual memorial tablet in St. Marcel’s church in Rome, Baglivi's burial place.

On 23 April 2007, Croatian Post issued a postage stamp in his honour, part of "Famous Croats" series.

== See also ==
- List of Italians and notable Ragusans
- Dubrovnik
- Dalmatia
