= Arachnoid granulation =

Protrusions of the arachnoid mater for returning cerebrospinal fluid to circulation

- Diagrammatic representation of a section across the top of the skull, showing the membranes of the brain, etc. ("Arachnoid granulation" label is at top right.)

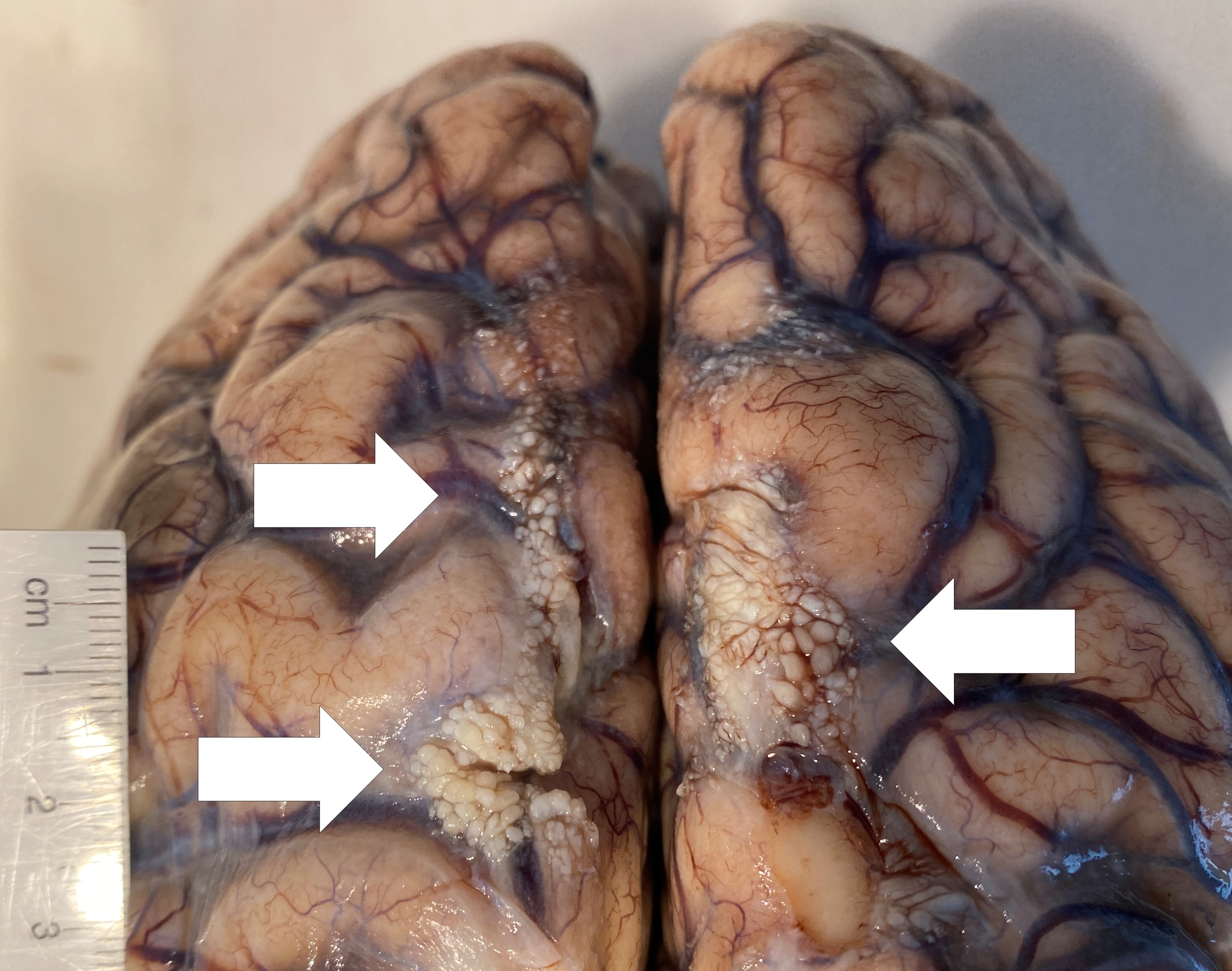
- Arachnoid granulations seen on autopsy, where the dura mater has been removed but the arachnoid mater is left in place.

Details

Identifiers
- Latin: granulationes arachnoideae
- TA98: A14.1.01.205
- TA2: 5389
- FMA: 77760

Arachnoid granulations (also arachnoid villi, and Pacchionian granulations or bodies) are small outpouchings of the arachnoid mater and subarachnoid space into the dural venous sinuses of the brain. The granulations are thought to mediate the draining of cerebrospinal fluid (CSF) from the subarachnoid space into the venous system.

The largest and most numerous granulations lie along the superior sagittal sinus; they are however present along other dural sinuses as well.

== Anatomy ==
The granulations are often situated near where cerebral veins drain into the dural sinuses. They are most prominent along the superior sagittal sinus, particularly those lodged within the lateral lacunae. In order of decreasing frequency, the granulations occur within the: superior sagittal sinus, transverse sinuses, superior petrosal sinuses, and straight sinus.

The arachnoid granulations may be lodged within granular foveae — small pits upon the inner surface of the cranial bones.

=== Structure ===
The arachnoid granulations are local outpouchings of the arachnoid mater, as well as the subarachnoid space enclosed within it, into the dural venous sinuses. The granulations exhibit a thinner stalk that penetrates through the wall of a venous sinus, and a distended head formed within the lumen of the sinus. The head consists of a trabecular collagenous core that is largely covered by a dural cupula, except for an apical cap — some 0.3 mm in diameter — of arachnoid cells attached directly to the dural venous endothelium.

=== Development ===
The granulations develop during childhood as separate arachnoid villi gradually aggregate into macroscopic clumps.

== Function ==
The arachnoid granulations are notably thought to be involved in resorption of cerebrospinal fluid, however, their function is not entirely understood.

=== Cerebrospinal fluid resorption ===
The arachnoid granulations act as one-way valves. Normally the pressure of the CSF is higher than that of the venous system, so CSF flows through the granulations into the blood. If the pressure is reversed for some reason, fluid will not pass back into the subarachnoid space. The reason for this is not known. It has been suggested that the endothelial cells of the venous sinus create vacuoles of CSF, which move through the cell and out into the blood.

The importance of arachnoid granulations for the drainage of CSF is controversial. The granulations are sparse during early life, possibly underscoring the importance of alternate mechanisms of drainage. A large portion (perhaps the majority) of CSF may in fact drain through lymphatics associated with extracranial segments of cranial nerves - especially through axons of CN I (olfactory nerve) through their extension through the cribriform plate.

=== Subarachnoid systolic overpressure dampening ===
A suggested alternative or additional function of the granulation may be the dispersal of the overpressure wave formed within the subarachnoid space by the pulsation of arteries during systole. As the venous sinuses are enclosed in rigid dural structures, they represent a non-distensible compartment into which subarachnoid pressure increases may be dispersed.

== Clinical significance ==
Age-related degenerative changes of the granulations and consequent decreased CSF resorption may underlie normal pressure hydrocephalus (which may in turn be pathogenetically implicated in additional age-related neurodegenerative disorders.

== Eponym ==
Occasionally, they are referred to by their old name: Pacchioni's bodies, named after Italian anatomist Antonio Pacchioni.

== Additional images ==
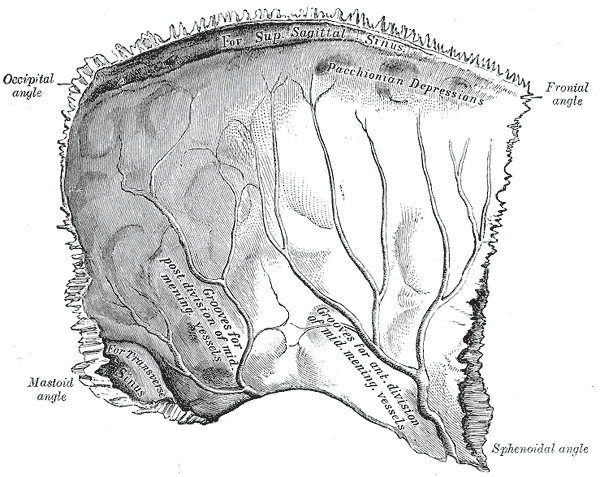
Left parietal bone. Inner surface.

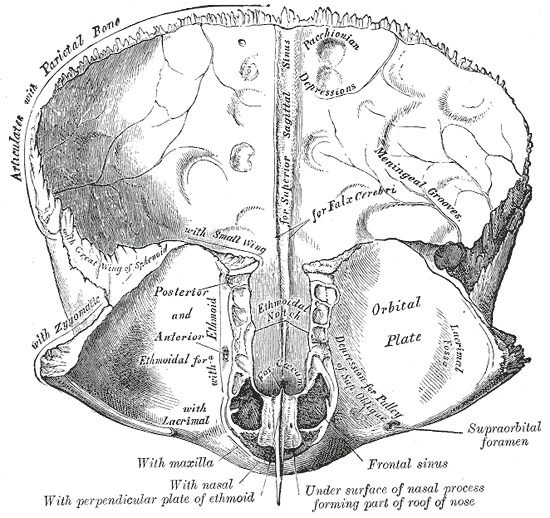
Frontal bone. Inner surface.

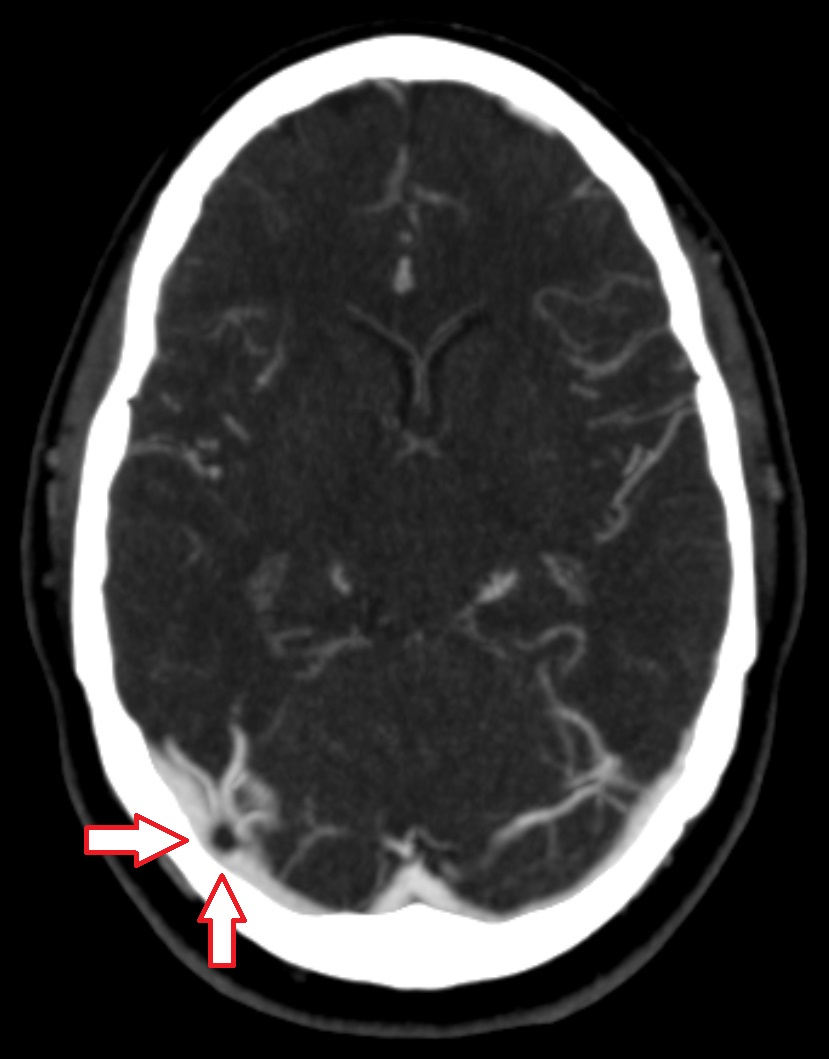
CT angiography showing an arachnoid granulation in the right transverse sinus

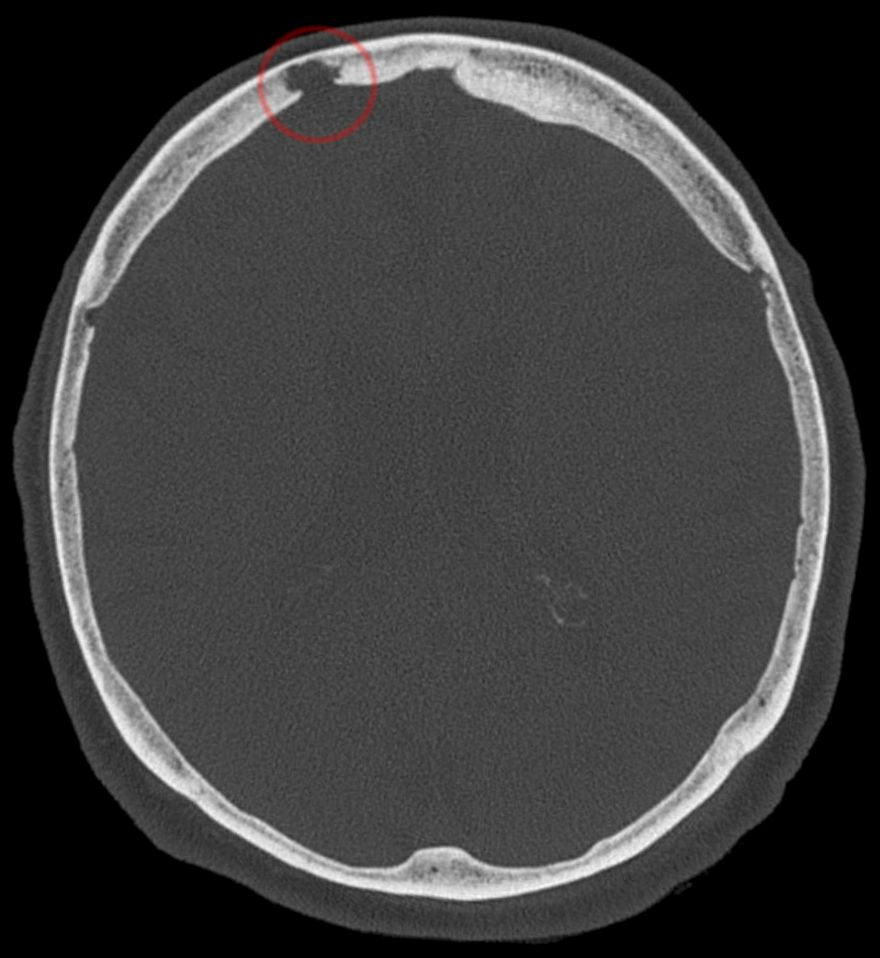
Non-contrast CT scan of the head showing an arachnoid granulation
