= Antonio Pacchioni =

Italian scientist and anatomist

Antonio Pacchioni (13 June 1665 – 5 November 1726) was an Italian scientist and anatomist, who focused chiefly on the outermost meningeal layer of the brain, the dura mater.

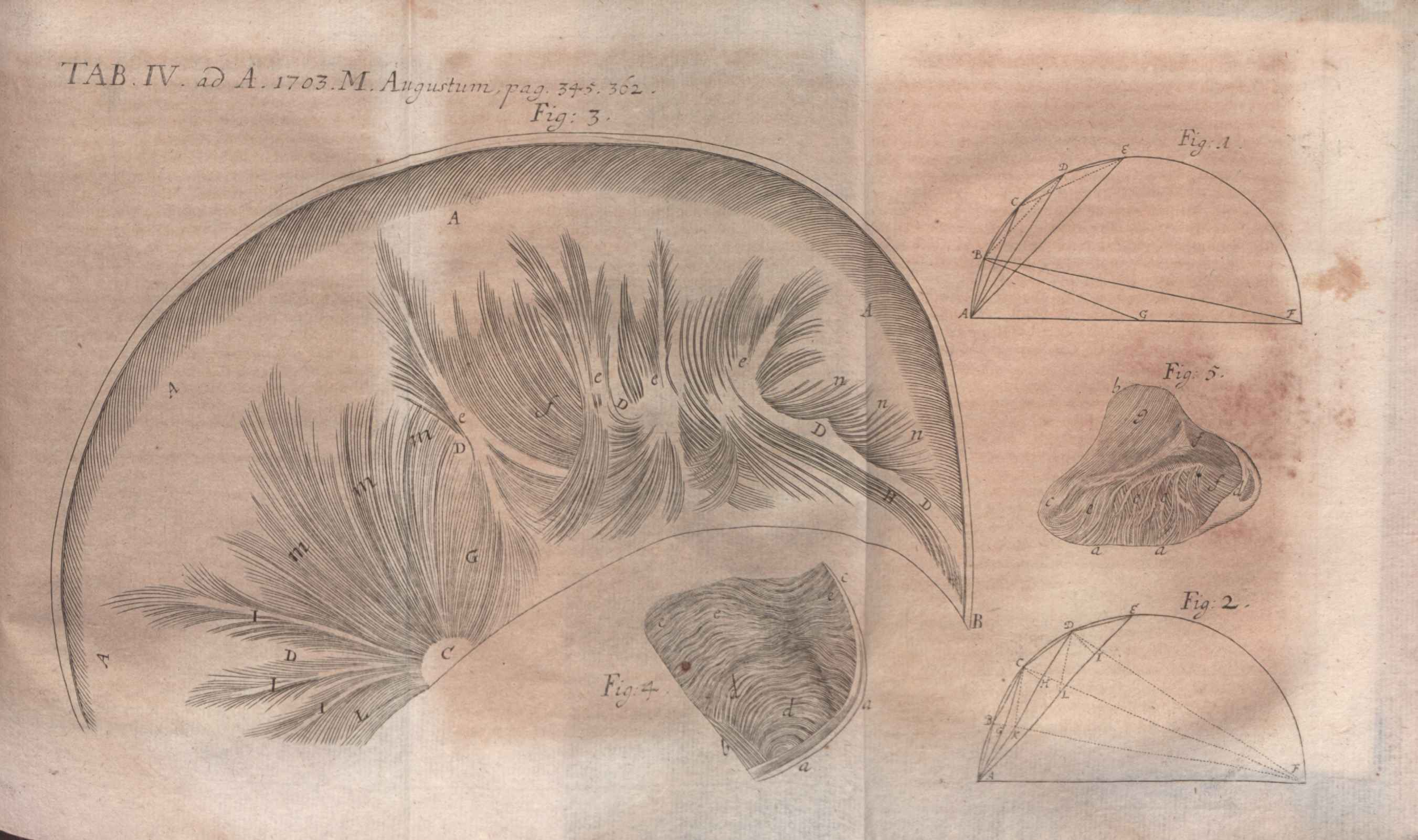
Illustration for the review of Disquisitio anatomicae de durae meningis... published on Acta Eruditorum in 1703

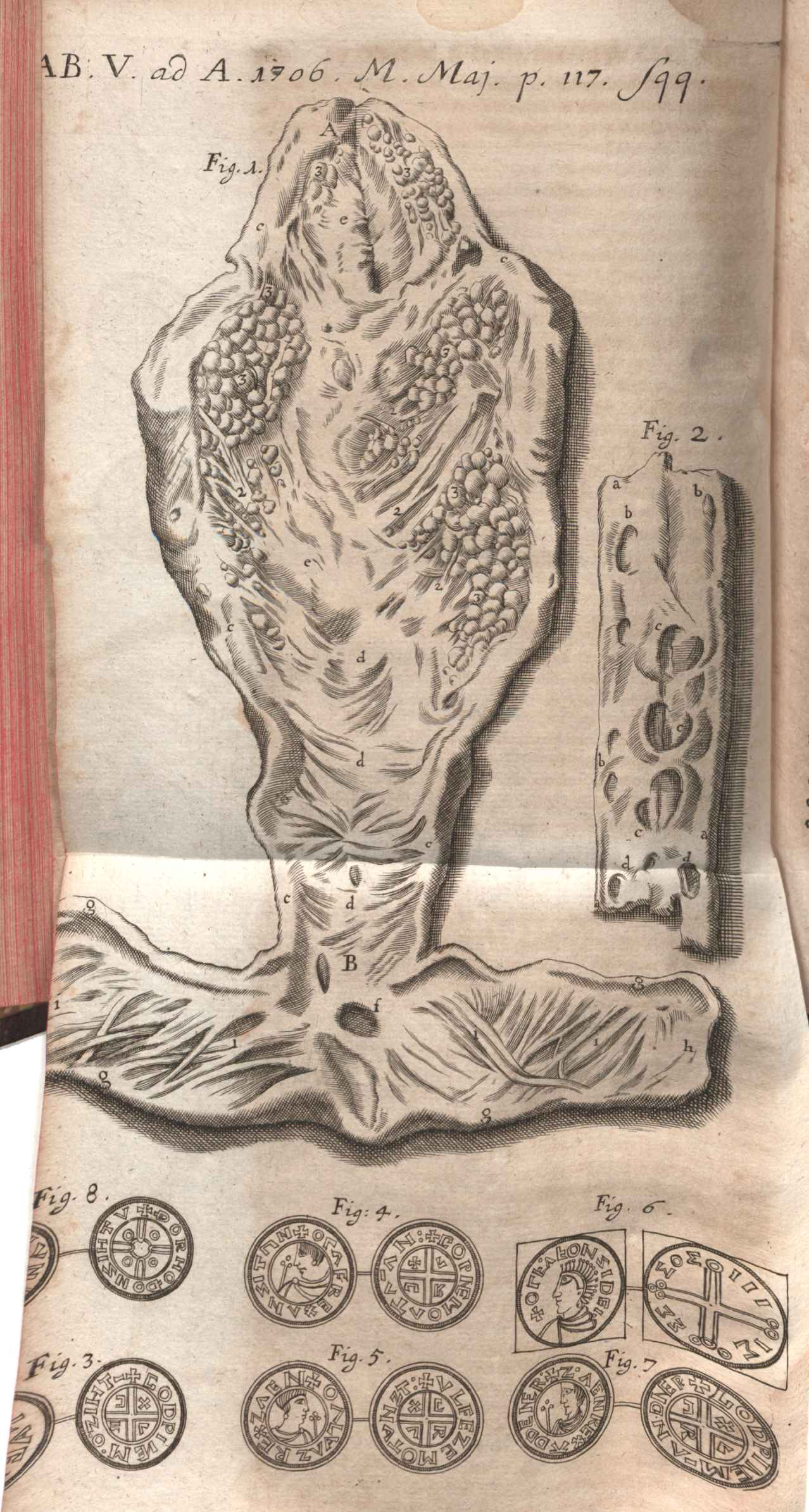
Illustration for the review of Dissertatio epistolaris de Glandulis... published on Acta Eruditorum in 1706

Pacchioni's granulations (or Pacchionian bodies), where the arachnoid layer protrudes through the dura, are named after him (although they are now generally known as arachnoid granulations).

== Biography ==
Pacchioni studied medicine at the university of his native city, Reggio Emilia , obtaining his degree on April 25, 1688. The next year he moved to Rome to devote himself to anatomy in particular; he spent his most productive years in Rome. He was a friend and student of Marcello Malpighi (1628–1694), who lived in Rome from 1691 to 1694. First attending the Santo Spirito in Sassia Hospital, he was an assistant physician at the Ospedale della Conzolazione from May 26, 1690 to June 3, 1693, and then remained for six years in Tivoli as the town doctor.

In 1699 Pacchioni returned to Rome and established a successful medical practice. He later became head physician at the Hospital of San Giovanni in Laterano and then at the Ospedale della Consolazione. In Rome, he made the acquaintance of the clinician and botanist Giovanni Maria Lancisi (1654–1720), with whom he collaborated in the publication of the anatomical plates of Eustachius in 1714.

Pacchioni's most important works particularly concerned the anatomy and function of the dura mater. His first dissertation on this dates from 1701 on, the most important being Dissertatio epistolaris de glandulis ... (1705) in which he described the arachnoidal granulations that are named after him.

== Career and life ==
Pacchioni was a "short man, with oblong face, vivid eye and a rather melancholic temperament" Following the customs of his time, he initially studied philosophy and only later turned to medicine, demonstrating a natural talent for anatomical dissection. He worked under the guidance of Antonio Vallisneri (1661–1730), Professor of Medicine at the University of Padova and member of the Royal Society of London (Vallisneri is also credited with the first description of the anatomical features of Stein Leventhal syndrome). After moving to Rome, he first attended the Ospedaledi S. Spirito in Sassia and then successfully applied for a position as assistant physician at the Ospedale della Consolazione (May 26, 1690), well known at that time for emergency medicine. As stated by Pacchioni himself, this early experience involved the frequent management of head injuries, which aroused his particular interest in brain coverings. Thanks to Malpighi's support, in July, 1693, Pacchioni became the town doctor in Tivoli, quickly gaining popular esteem and approval. Here he spent 6 years under the patronage of the Duke of Modena at the Villa d'Este. Upon his return to Rome, he published in 1701 his first observations on the structure and function of dura mater: De Dura Meninge Fabrica et Usu Disquisitio Analomica.

Pacchioni had a passion for research and a constant devotion to constructive scientific debate, mutual confrontation with colleagues, exchange of experiences, and education of younger colleagues (he often presented candidates in the discussion of their doctoral thesis). Moreover, Pacchioni exhibited a remarkable attention to scientific progress beyond Italy's borders as shown by the frequent quotation of foreign authors in his works (Willis and Vieussens among others). Further evidence of his merits is the deferential friendship he shared with men such as Giambattista Morgagni (1682–1771), Malpighi (1627- 1694), and especially with Lancisi (1654–1720), who requested the collaboration of Pacchioni in the preparation of his De Motu Cordis et Aneurismatibus (1728) and in the first edition of the Tabulae Anatomicae (1714) collected by Bartolomeo Eustachio (1500–1574).

In 1700, Pacchioni was on the verge of becoming Lancisi's successor for the Chair of Anatomy at the University La Sapienza, upon the recommendation of Lancisi himself. Sadly, he decided to withdraw—formally in deference to his competitor Giorgio Baglivi (1668–1707), but more likely because the latter was known to be a protegé of Pope Innocenzo XII.

The year 1705 was a special time in Pacchioni's life: he was appointed head physician at the ancient Ospedaledi S. Giovanni in Laterano, and published the original description of arachnoid granulations in his Dissertatio Epistolaris de Glandulis Conglobatis Durae Meningis Humanae. He was fellow of several prestigious academies such as the Accademia delle Scienze of Bologna, Accademia dei Fisiocritici of Siena, and the Accademia Cesareo-Leopoldina de' Curiosi della Natura of Leipzig; he also attended meetings of the Roman Accademia dell' Arcadia under the pseudonym of "Euforo Craneo" ("attentive observer of the skull"). He was sometimes asked for consultation as a police doctor.

== Final years ==
Precarious health forced Pacchioni to accept the less demanding charge of head physician at his favorite Ospedale della Consolazione, where he worked until retirement. He was struck by an undetermined disease of the central nervous system (perhaps a tumor or intracranial hematoma) that caused seizures, a right hemiparesis, and progressive mental deterioration. He was attended to by his most trusted colleagues and his old master Vallisneri. Pacchioni died in Rome at 62 years of age.

== Thoughts and works ==
Despite his extreme versatility, Pacchioni is best known as an anatomist and a skilled dissector. He made significant contributions to the elucidation of the structure and function of dura mater, investigating its fine structure. Following Malpighi's teachings, he made use of the microscope, an advanced technology of his time, and systematically treated the anatomical specimens by original techniques of maceration into "... strong, sour, salted, sweet, and oily fluids .... ". For example, in the Dissertatio Epistotaris..., Pacchioni pointed out how arachnoid villi swell "... to the size of a millet seed... " after dura is "...soaked for a month first into plain water and then into vinegar..." (recommending frequent renewal of the bath in order to avoid smell!)

The interpretation of Pacchioni's morphological findings was adversely influenced by his adherence to the "iatromechanical doctrine," whereby the function of an organ was merely based on its mechanical activity. Therefore, he believed that dura mater was a special kind of membranous muscle ("musculus suigeneris membranaceus"), comparable to cardiac muscle, made up of several layers of fibers and arranged in three bellies and four tendons; its contractions served to squeeze the glands which, in Malpighi's opinion, constituted the cerebral cortex, pushing their secretion along nerve roots? Among Pacchioni's findings, we recall the description of the tentorial notch (the so-called "Pacchioni's oval foramen"), the observation that dural adherence to the inner table is variable in different areas, and especially the discovery of arachnoid granulations. In 1705, Pacchioni dedicated to Professor Luca Schrok (a German colleague from Augsburg) the Dissertatio Epistolaris de Glandulis Conglobatis Durae Meningis Hurnanae, indeque Ortis Lymphaticis and Piam Meningem produclis.

One of his popular papers is written in Latin and illustrated with two figures and remarkable for its scientific rigor, careful report of materials and methods, and frequent quotation of up-to-date international literature. While exploring the internal structure of the superior sagittal sinus, Pacchioni was struck by those minute globular bodies (which he named "glandulae conglo-batae"), each wrapped by its own capsule, clustering on either side of the sinus. Numerous thin filaments, which he thought were lymphatic vessels, seemed to bloom from the "glandulae," running toward the pia on one side and penetrating dural layers on the other. Therefore, he concluded that his "glandulae" (glands) had the function of secreting lymph to lubricate the sliding movements between brain and meninges during contractions. Although these speculations appear grossly incorrect in the light of present knowledge, new observations seem "to do justice" to Antonio Pacchioni. In a recent study, Go, et al., ~ using enzyme ultracnytochemistry, detected Na+/K + adenosine triphosphatase activity on cap cells of arachnoid villi; they proposed that this biochemical mechanism could contribute to CSF absorption. This assumption implies a "'secretory" component in CSF absorption along with the already widely accepted mechanisms. It is remarkable to note that, if this single observation is confirmed, we may have to look at arachnoid villi not simply as hydrostatic pressure-gated valves, but as actual secreting structures: that is, as glands or "glandulae," as Antonio Pacchioni suggested three centuries ago.

== Works ==
(Books are kept at exclusive libraries such as the Harvard Medical Library)

- Chiappelli, Jacopo (1783). "Notizie intorno alla vita di Antonio Pacchioni da Reggio". Raccolta d'opuscoli scientifici e filologici. III. Modena: Biblioteca Modenese: 415–419.
- Capparoni, Pietro (1914). "Lo stato di servizio di Antonio Pacchioni all'Ospedale della consolazione in Roma ed un suo medaglione onorario". Rivista di storia delle scienze mediche e naturali. 2: 241–245.
- Benassi, Enrico (1932). "Carteggi inediti fra il Lancisi, il Pacchioni ed il Morgagni". Rivista di storia delle scienze mediche e naturali. 23: 145–169.
- Bertolani del Rio, Maria (1935). "Antonio Pacchioni 1665–1726". In Luigi Barchi (ed.). Medici e naturalisti Reggiani. Reggio nell'Emilia. pp. 659–667.
