= Ambrogio Soldani =

Italian Camaldolese monk

Dom Ambrogio Soldani
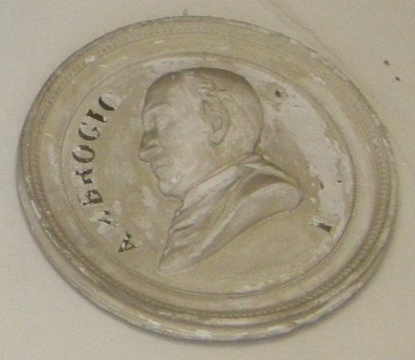
- Ambrogio Soldani
- Born: Baldo Maria Soldani; June 15, 1736; Pratovecchio, Grand Duchy of Tuscany
- Died: 15 June 1815 (aged 79); Florence, Grand Duchy of Tuscany
- Known for: studies on micropaleontology
- Parent(s): Soldano Soldani and Benedetta Soldani (née Nesterini)
- Scientific career
- Fields: Mathematics, paleontology, geology, astronomy
- Workplaces: University of Siena

Ambrogio Soldani O.S.B. Cam. (15 June 1736 – 14 July 1808) was an Italian Camaldolese monk who is known for his works relating the shell fossils found in the mountains of Tuscany. Some of his work could now be viewed as the intersection of geology, zoology and paleontology. Today Soldani is considered, together with Jacopo Bartolomeo Beccari, the father of micropaleontology. Charles Lyell considered him one of the most important eighteenth-century naturalists. He also published observations about astronomy.

== Biography ==
He was born in Pratovecchio, and entered the Camaldolese order in the Monastery of Santa Maria degli Angeli in Florence as a young man (1732), yet he took an interest in mathematics. He transferred to the Monastery of San Michele di Pisa. Soldani was anointed abbot in 1776, and four years later he became the superintendent of the abbey of Santa Mustiola in Siena. There he began examining under a microscope the fossils in Tuscan chalk deposits, near Siena and Volterra. In 1780 he published a preliminary Saggio orittografico, where he described various fossil bearing localities and explains the geology of Tuscany. The work impressed his contemporaries, and the Grand duke of Tuscany, Pietro Leopoldo, appointed Soldani professor of Mathematics at the University of Siena. Soldani also became the secretary of the Accademia dei Fisiocritici, a prominent scientific and scholarly society established in Siena in 1691. In 1783, he traveled through the Romagna region gathering more samples and exploring thermal springs. On 16 June 1794, there was an aerolite or meteor shower in Siena, and he published his observations and about meteor samples. Upon his death, he gifted his fossil collections to the state.

== Works ==
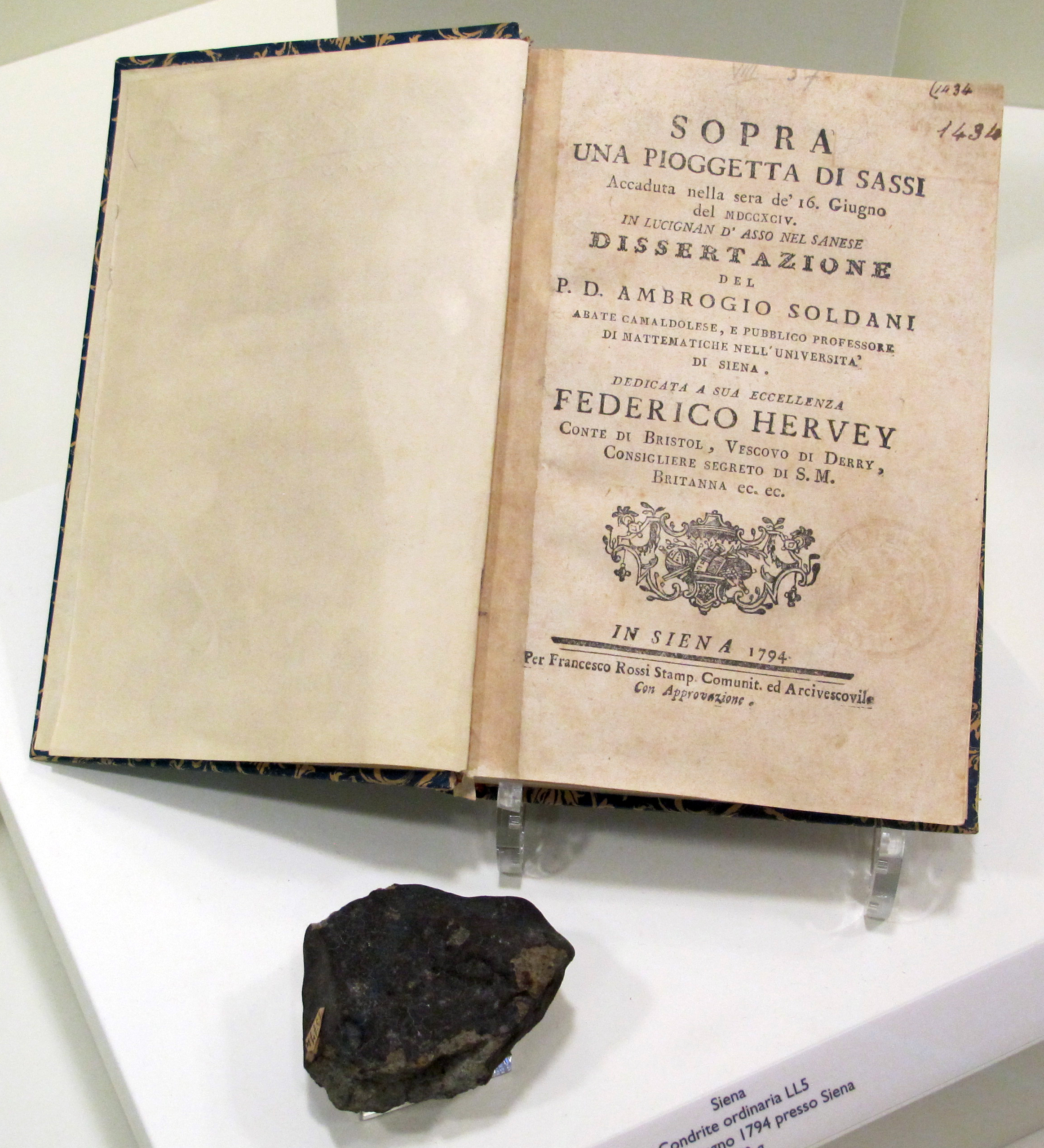
Sopra una pioggetta di sassi, Siena, 1794

Among his works were:

- Saggio orittografico ovvero osservazioni sopra le terre nautilitiche ed ammonitiche della Toscana [Observations about Tuscan lands with ammonites and nautiloids] (in Italian). Siena. 1780.
- Testaceographia ac Zoophytographia parva et microscopica (in Latin). Siena. 1789–1798.
- Sopra una pioggetta di sassi accaduta nella sera de' 16 giugno del MDCCXCIV in Lucignan d'Asso nel Sanese (in Italian). Siena. 1794.

== Bibliography ==
- Manasse, Ernesto (1908). "Commemorazione di Ambrogio Soldani". Atti dell'Accademia dei Fisiocritici di Siena. 20: 365–376.
- Napoli, Ferdinando (1909). Ambrogio Soldani nel primo centenario della sua morte (1808-1908). Rome: Tip. Pont, dell'Istituto Pio IX.
- Silvestri, Orazio (1872). "Ambrogio Soldani e le sue opere". Atti della Società italiana di scienze naturali. 15: 273–289.
- Rodolico, Francesco (1970). "Soldani Ambrogio (Or Baldo Maria)". In Charles Coulston Gillispie (ed.). Dictionary of Scientific Biography. Vol. 12. New York: Charles Scribner's Sons. pp. 517–518.
