= Pirro Maria Gabrielli =

Italian physician

- Bust of Pirro Maria Gabrielli
- Born: 1 April 1643; Siena, Grand Duchy of Tuscany
- Died: 19 December 1705 (aged 62); Siena, Grand Duchy of Tuscany
- Education: University of Siena
- Employer: University of Siena
- Known for: Accademia dei Fisiocritici
- Scientific career
- Fields: Physiologist, physician

Pirro Maria Gabrielli (1 April 1643 – 19 December 1705) was an Italian physician, residing in his native Siena. In 1691, he founded of the Accademia dei Fisiocritici.

== Biography ==
Pirro Maria Gabrielli was born in Siena in 1643 to Giovanni Gabrielli and Aurelia Cosatti, and was baptised on 2 April of that year. He initially began studies of logic and philosophy in Siena under Ascanio Venturi Gallerani, but settled to study also medicine. He became a member of the Signoria of Siena in 1668, the year he received his doctorate in medicine and philosophy. The following year, he was appointed lecturer in Simplicia (the study of medicinal plants) at the University of Siena. In 1672, he became a professor of logic. Gabrielli served as gonfaloniere in 1681 and capitano del Popolo in 1682. In 1690, he was admitted to the Sienese Accademia degli Intronati, under the name Indovino.

On 18 April 1678, Gabrielli married Virginia Bartalini, with whom he had ten children. He was a councillor of the Sienese College of Medicine and Philosophy from 1679 and served as protomedico (chief public health officer) from 1688 to 1689. In 1696 he became a member of the Academia Naturae Curiosorum, under the name Stratone Lampsaceno.

In 1691, Gabrielli befriended the mathematician Elia Astorini, a disciple of Borelli who was appointed to the chair of mathematics at the Nuova Accademia dei Nobili (New Academy of the Nobles) in Siena that same year. On 17 March 1691, Gabrielli and Astorini founded a scholarly-scientific society known as the Accademia dei Fisiocritici, adopting the Lucretian motto Veris quod possit vincere falsa (that the false may be overcome by the true). During the first public session on 5 July, Astorini was named principe, while Gabrielli was appointed assessore and moderatore perpetuo. Gabrielli gathered his students in the medical faculty into the Accademia so that they could study the natural sciences free of the restriction of prescribed course curricula. After a twenty-year suspension following Gabrielli's death, the academy reopened under the presidency of the economist Sallustio Bandini in 1759 and continues to exist to this day.

Hall of the Accademia dei Fisiocritici with a meridian line traced on the floor and a Boylean vacuum pump

The group originally met in the library of the Spedale di Santa Maria della Scala. In 1694 the academy moved to the Casa della Sapienza, now the hall of the Biblioteca Comunale degli Intronati belonging to the University of Siena. In 1816 the group moved to the former Camaldolese monastery donated to it by the Grand Duke Ferdinand III of Tuscany, and now serving as a Natural History museum.

In 1699, the academy engendered a literary complement with the Arcadian name of Colonia Fisiocritica. Gabrielli performed numerous experiments designed to demonstrate the existence of a vacuum using an air pump inspired by the one built in 1658 by the English polymath Robert Hooke. He conducted works on scientific instruments such as a heliometer and a meridian line, and combined astronomical and astrological observations, including observations about the 1681 comet. Gabrielli died in Siena on 19 December 1705, aged 62.

== Opere ==
- Gabbrielli, Pirro Maria (1702). Tavole perpetue, calcolate a giusta misura degli orioli sanesi per uso principalmente degli ecclesiastici. Siena: Bonetti.
- Gabbrielli, Pirro Maria (1705). Heliometro fisiocritico, o vero La meridiana sanese. Siena: Bonetti.

== Bibliography ==
- De Gregorio, Mario (1998). "GABBRIELLI, Pirro Maria". Dizionario Biografico degli Italiani (in Italian). Vol. 51: Gabbiani–Gamba. Rome: Institute of the Italian Encyclopaedia. ISBN 978-88-12-00032-6.
