= Subarachnoid lymphatic-like membrane =

Proposed fourth meningeal layer

The subarachnoid lymphatic-like membrane (SLYM) is a possible fourth meningeal layer that was proposed in 2023 in the brain of humans and mice. Its existence is still very controversial.

The SLYM would be located in the subarachnoid space, the space between the middle reticular meninges and the innermost tender meninges that lie close to the brain. It divides the subarachnoid space into an outer, superficial compartment and an inner, deeper area surrounding the brain.

== Structure ==
The SLYM is reported to be a thin monolayer of cells and contains its own immune cells. The SLYM may inhibit larger molecules, such as peptides and proteins, from passing into the interior of the brain and could thus assume a barrier function.

== Discovery and interpretation ==
SLYM was first reported as a possible novel anatomical structure in the human brain. SLYM is impermeable to any molecule larger than 3,000 daltons. It may have an immunological role, in which immune cell numbers change with aging or inflammation.

In February 2023, research groups from Germany, Finland, Switzerland, South Korea and USA submitted comments to the eLetters section of the paper challenging the paper's conclusions for its methodology and conclusions as misinterpreted or by stating the structure was already known. The SLYM investigators from Denmark, Germany, Brazil, Poland, Japan, Spain and US argued that the textbook description of the meningeal layers is based on histology only. The subarachnoid space as well as the meningeal membranes are exposed to significant deformation during preparations of histological sections. This was further probed by in vivo MRI and fresh dissection. Only in vivo studies of brain fluid transport can reveal the dynamics of cerebrospinal fluid transport and its barriers. Pietilä et al., 2023 also described the existence of a Prox1+ cell layer located within the arachnoid beneath and separate from E-cadherin+ arachnoid barrier cells.
