= Giuseppe Sterzi =

Italian anatomist, neuroanatomist, and medical historian

Giuseppe Nazzareno Sterzi (1876–1919) was an Italian anatomist, neuroanatomist and medical historian. Although his research activity encompassed no more than fifteen years, the themes treated by Sterzi are relevant to neuroanatomy and history of anatomy. Sterzi’s research on comparative neuroanatomy and embryology were acknowledged by numerous contemporaries (Bardeleben, Chiarugi, Edinger, Eisler, Johnston, Krause, Nicolas, Obersteiner, Sobotta) and many of his discoveries were soon incorporated into anatomy textbooks. Sterzi was awarded several scientific prizes, among which were the ‘Premio Fossati’ of the Reale Istituto Lombardo di Scienze e di Lettere, Milano in 1909 and the ‘Prix Lallemand’ of the Académie des Sciences de l'Institut de France, Paris in 1912.

== Biography ==
Sterzi was born into a noble family in Cittadella, Italy. His father Paolo, who in his student years in Padova had been involved in the patriotic uprisings against the Austrian government, was an engineer; his mother was Carolina Barolo. In 1893 he matriculated in the University of Pisa where he joined the medical school. The Chairman Professor Guglielmo Romiti asked him to enter the Anatomy department. In 1899 he graduated in Medicine, and few months later was appointed senior lecturer in the Anatomy Department of the University of Padova, then directed by Professor Dante Bertelli. In 1906 he became Professor of Topographical Anatomy on annual contract and in 1910, having been selected by the National Search Committee, he was made full Professor and Chairman of the Anatomy Department of the University of Cagliari. In the summer of 1915, Sterzi volunteered for the Italian Army where he served as medical officer. After the end of World War I, Sterzi, who had the rank of lieutenant colonel and was entitled to be released from the army, chose to remain in his office as director of the military hospital of Arezzo during the postwar Spanish flu epidemic. During the winter of 1919 he contracted a fever and died at the age of 43. He left a wife, and four sons, one of whom later became a doctor and Professor of Dermatology, Guido Sterzi.

== Scientific career ==
Sterzi wrote the following textbooks: “Il Sistema nervoso centrale dei vertebrati” (The vertebrate central nervous system), 1907-1912; and “Anatomia del sistema nervoso centrale dell'uomo” (Anatomy of the human central nervous system), 1914-1915. Following the publication of the first book, John Black Johnston (1908), one of Sterzi's illustrious American contemporaries, wrote in a review published in The Anatomical Record: “Sterzi's work promises to be the most extensive work in any language dealing with the central nervous system of vertebrates.” “Meninges of the Spinal Medulla and of the Brain” (1899–1902) is a series of seven articles that represents the progression of his thesis and that includes a monograph on medullary meninges. Sterzi illustrates the comparative anatomy of meninges from the amphioxus to man. Contrary to previous reports the spinal meninges, both in the adult lower vertebrates and in the early developmental stages of the more advanced vertebrates, are very simple. From the mesenchyme surrounding the neural tube only a single leaflet forms the primitive meninx. In the following phylo- and ontogenetic stages, the latter divides into an internal leaflet: the secondary meninx, and into an external one: the dura mater. Finally, in higher vertebrates, even the secondary meninx divides into the arachnoid and the pia. In the same animals, Sterzi demonstrated that, while in the spinal medulla the dura keeps its identity, in the skull it fuses with the periosteum (Sterzi, 1902). He also demonstrated the continuity of all meninges with the envelopes of nerves and with the filum terminale.

The second group of studies, “Vessels of the Spinal Medulla” (1900–1904) and of the Brainstem (1913) started with a communication read by the young Sterzi at the 14th Congress of the German Anatomical Society in 1900. It includes a paper of 370 pages written in German for the journal Anatomische Hefte (Sterzi, 1904), dealing with the comparative anatomy and embryology of these vessels from the cyclostomes (petromyzontes) to man. Sterzi showed that, both in petromyzontes and in the precocious developmental stages of higher vertebrates, the spinal medulla receives its blood from the superficial vessels. It is only in later stages that vessels penetrate the spinal medulla in various patterns. He also demonstrated that, whereas in lower vertebrates there are portions of the spinal medulla supplied by venous blood and others by the arterial one, in later phylo and ontogenetic stages the blood supply becomes uniform for the formation of longitudinal tracts among the primitive metameric systems. In 1913, Sterzi published a study on the development of mammalian central arteries in the spinal medulla, medulla oblongata, and pons (Sterzi, 1913). He observed that these arteries maintain their symmetrical arrangement in the pons, whereas in the lower segments, owing to the formation of the median fissure, they give rise to a single median tract. In “Hypophysis” (1904), Sterzi studied the hypophysis of petromyzontes and, at variance with previous findings, demonstrated that no infundibular gland exists in these cyclostomes (Sterzi, 1904). He also investigated the comparative anatomy of this organ in all vertebrates.

In “The Regio Parietalis (of Diencephalon) in Lower Craniates” (1905), Sterzi demonstrates that there are organs which are single (epiphysis and paraphysis) and organs that are originally double (pineal and parapineal organs; Sterzi, 1905). The latter, however, in adult petromyzontes become both asymmetrical acquiring a median location below the cranial vault, which is fissured in their correspondence. They have the structure of a sort of eyes (parietal eyes). “General Neuroanatomy” (1912–1914) is a series of articles on the development of the longitudinal cerebral fissure (Sterzi, 1912) and that on the significance of the human encephalon and telencephalon (Sterzi, 1914). Concerning the first topic, Sterzi demonstrates that, contrary to earlier reports, the longitudinal fissure is not due to pressure exerted by the falx cerebri but that it is the product of the rapid outgrowth of the cerebral hemispheres from the lateral portions of the telencephalic vesicle. He also maintains that the third ventricle consists, not only of the posterior diencephalic portion, but of a smaller anterior one of telencephalic origin. In the second article (Sterzi, 1914), Sterzi criticizes the concept put forward by Edinger(1911) that the human brain consists of a neoencephalic portion: the cerebral cortex, and of a paleoencephalic one: the remaining encephalon. He demonstrates that even in the portion that Edinger considers paleoencephalon there are neoencephalic derivatives. Concerning whether all portions of the brain really evolve from lower craniates to man, he demonstrates that this is not the case because, in the course of phylogenesis, some parts evolve and others regress.

The article “Anatomy and Embryology of the Endolymphatic Sac” (1909) is devoted to the anatomy and embryology of the endolymphatic sac. In humans the sac is included into the endocranium, while in lower vertebrates it is located in between the dura and the endocranium. It is absent in selachians and teleosteans while its presence is doubtful in petromyzontes. In the work “Anatomy of Subcutaneous Tissue” (1910), the subcutaneous tissue is carefully studied in its general characteristics: development, chronology, gender, and nutritional conditions (Sterzi, 1910). In addition it is described in the various regions of the human body. The subcutaneous tissue is divided into two layers: superficial and deep, that in the head, neck, trunk, and proximal limbs are separated from each other by an intermediate layer homologous to the muscular one found in other mammals. This intermediate layer in man gives rise to the cutaneous muscles of the head and neck and to the subcutaneous and superficial parts of the external anal sphincter. In the other regions it constitutes the superficial fascia, which is lacking in distal limbs.

== Medical historian ==
By searching in the archives of the University of Padova, Sterzi came to know that Fabricius ab Aquapendente had willed to the government of the Republic of Venice the famous Tabulae Anatomicae that had been considered lost for 200 years. He found them, together with three other works of Fabricius, in the Marciana Library in Venezia. Of the 300 tables mentioned by Fabricius, there were only 167, bound into eight volumes (seven devoted to human and one to comparative anatomy). Besides being the most important anatomical work of the 16th and 17th centuries, the Tabulae Pictae, which are in folio, represent the first coloured (hand-painted) anatomical atlas in history. In “The Tabulae Anatomicae (Pictae) by Fabricius ab Aquapendente” (1909) Sterzi could ascertain that Fabricius incorporated into these drawings findings obtained by his former dissectors Giulio Casseri and Giulio Cesare Sala.

In the monograph “Giulio Casseri (Casserius; 1552–1616) Anatomist and Surgeon” (1910), Sterzi gives a report of the biography and achievements of this anatomist, and of the teaching of Anatomy in the Padua Medical School. The works of Casserius (De Vocis Auditusque Organis, Pentaestheseion, Tabulae Anatomicae), who started as house servant of Fabricius and then became dissector and eventually the first Professor of Surgery in Padova, is described and documented in detail, as well as the long quarrel that later developed between him and his former master, Fabricius. Sterzi published in 1910 an article about the period of lectorship in Padua of the Polish physician Joseph Struthius (1510–1568).

"I Progressi della Nevrologia" (1910), is a concise history of neuroscience based on a direct reading of classic works. Among the theories reported by Sterzi is that of Plato, who stated that man has three souls with different functions, an idea that resonates with the modern concept of the triune brain (MacLean, 1970). He also reported the progresses of neuroscience from the Renaissance to the 19th century. He stressed the importance of the anatomical and embryological comparative approach started by Willis and later revived by Cuvier and His. Later that year, Sterzi wrote another article, where he demonstrated that Botallus, and not Carcano (as Scarpa believed), had been the first discoverer of the foramen ovale.

== Bibliography ==
- Sterzi G., The Subcutaneous tissues (tela subcutanea) [print] : anatomical researches], 1915.
- Sterzi G., Il sistema nervoso centrale dei vertebrati : ricerche anatomiche ed embriologiche, Padova : A. Draghi, 1907-1912.
- Sterzi G., Giulio Casseri, anatomico e chirurgo (c. 1552-1616)., 1909.
- Sterzi G., LE "TABULAE ANATOMICAE" ED I CODICI MARCIANI CON NOTE AUTOGRAFE DI HIERONYMUS FABRICIUS AB AQUAPENDENTE, 1909.
- Sterzi G., Anatomia del sistema nervoso centrale dell'uomo, trattato per medici e studenti., Padova, Draghi, 1914-15.
- Riva A, Orrù B, Riva FT. Giuseppe Sterzi (1876-1919) of the University of Cagliari: a brilliant neuroanatomist and medical historian. „The Anatomical Record”. 261 (3), 2000.
