= Paleoencephalon =

Parts of the brain which are not in the neocortex or neoencephalon

In the anatomy of animals, paleoencephalon refers to most regions in the brain that are not part of the neocortex or neoencephalon.

The paleoencephalon is the phylogenetically oldest part of the animal brain. Paleoenchepheal areas of older species are larger in proportion to overall brain volume as compared to those of mammals. The Paleocortex is a type of thin, primitive cortical tissue that consists of three to five cortical laminae. In comparison, the neocortex has six layers and the archicortex has three or four layers.
