= Luca Tozzi =

Italian physician (1638–1717)

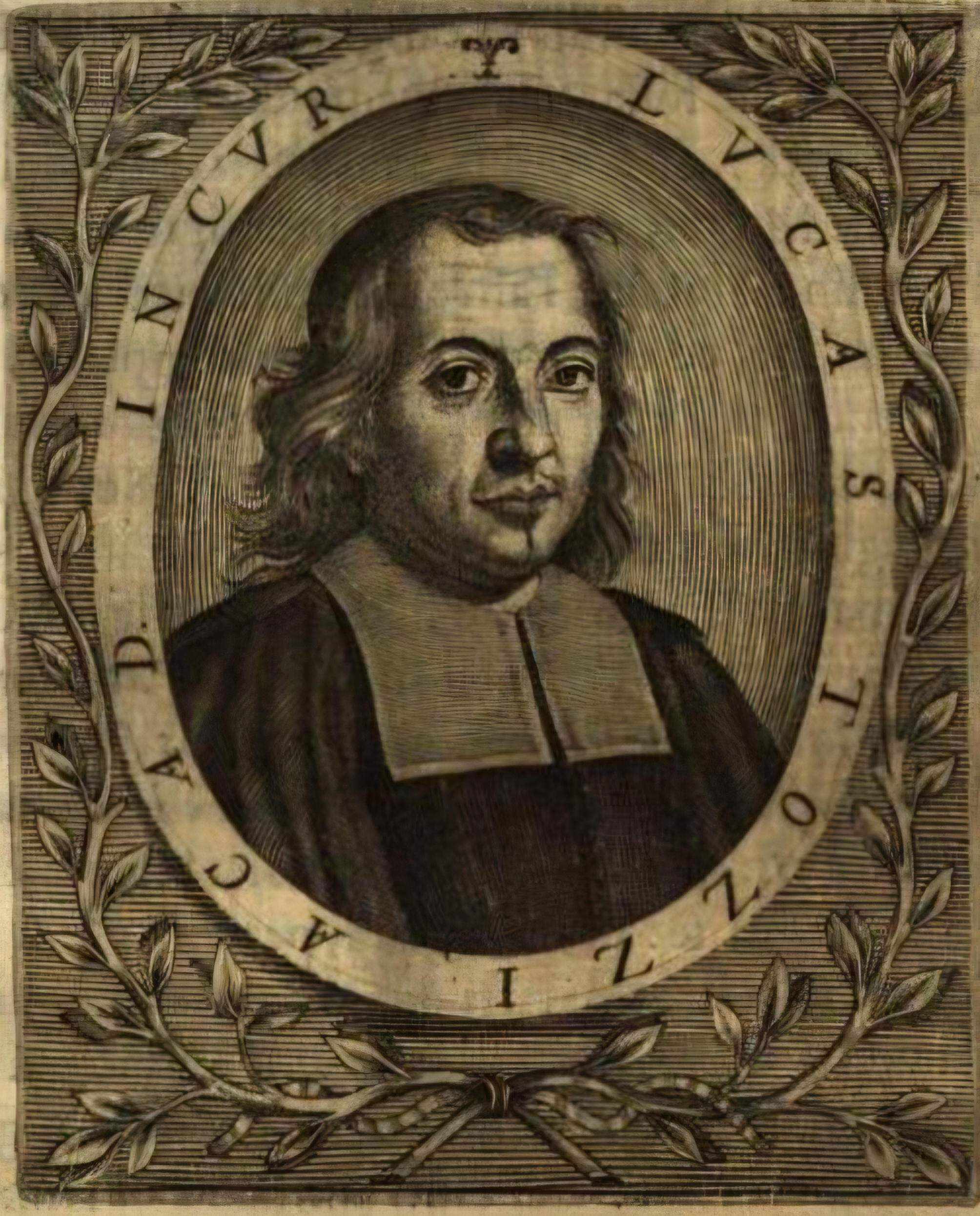
Engraved portrait of Luca Tozzi

Luca Tozzi (21 November 1638 – 11 March 1717) was an Italian physician, active in Rome and Naples.

== Biography ==
He was born in Frignano, near Aversa. He graduated with a degree in medicine in 1659. He published observations of the Comet of 1664. In Naples he joined the Accademia dei Discordanti. He was a substitute teacher for Tomaso Cornelio at the University of Naples and was named a professor of institutional medicine in 1694. In 1696, he accepted a position as the chief papal physician (archiatro pontificio) and professor of medicine at the University of the Sapienza, where he replaced Marcello Malpighi. With the passing of Pope Innocent XII, he returned to Naples, where he obtained the title of leading physician of the kingdom of Charles II. His works were published in 1721 in Venice.
