= Orazio Silvestri =

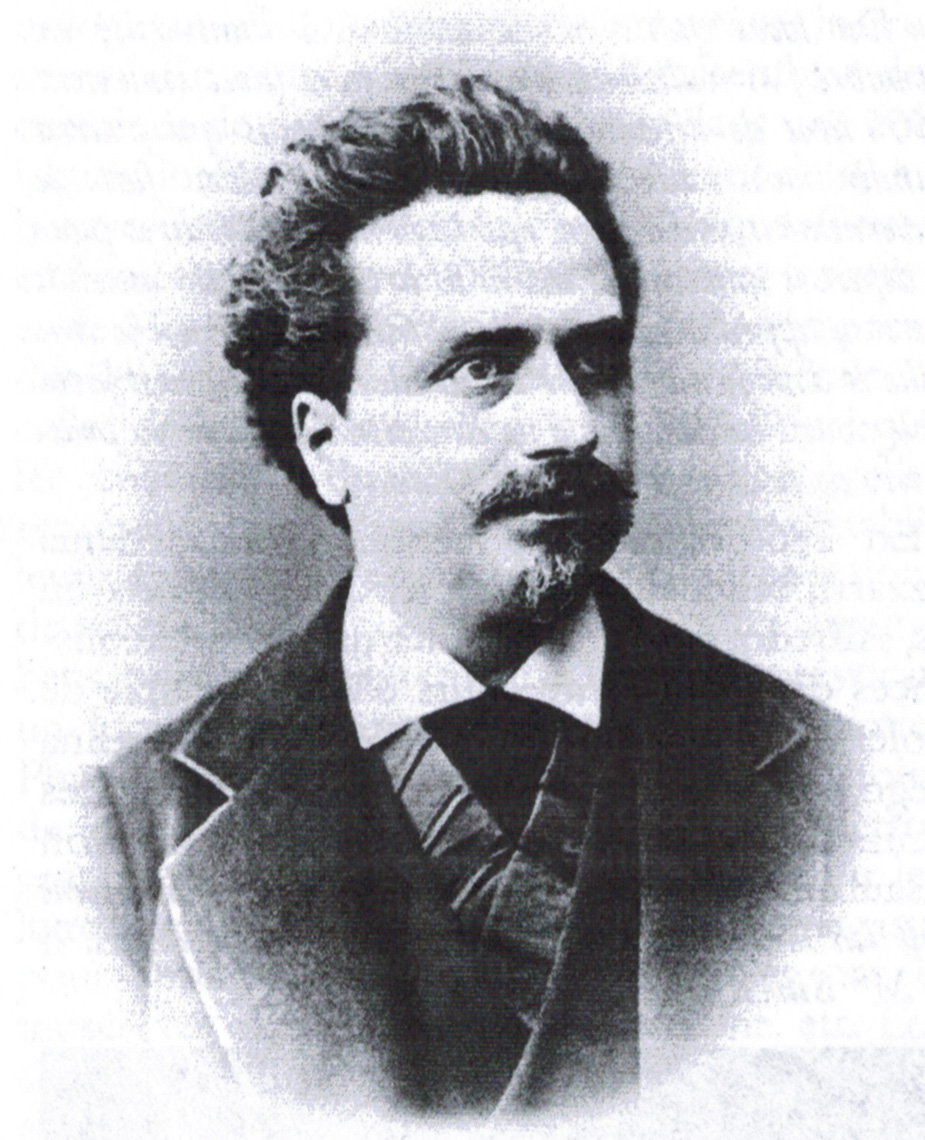
- Born: 7 February 1835; Florence, Papal States
- Died: 17 August 1890 (aged 55); Catania, Kingdom of Italy
- Scientific career
- Fields: Volcanologist, geologist

Orazio Silvestri (7 February 1835 – 17 August 1890) was an Italian geologist and volcanologist. To him are entitled Monti Silvestri, two pyroclastic cones formed in 1892 north of Nicolosi, at an altitude of 1,900 m, on the slopes of Mount Etna. At a time, such as that of the mid-nineteenth century, when the Italian scientific production was slow due to lack of valid scholars, numerous works of Silvestri found prominence in the most prestigious national and international scientific publications. After his death, he bequeathed studies and works of great value for understanding the evolution of Etna whom had devoted much of his life.

The famous German mineralogist and petrographer Arnold von Lasaulx, with whom he collaborated, defined Silvestri as the "greatest connoisseur of the giant volcano, of the power of its manifestations and of its strength".
