= Accademia dei Fisiocritici =

Academy in Siena, Italy

- Abbreviation: I Fisiocritici
- Formation: 1691
- Headquarters: Siena, Italy
- Coordinates: 43°19′6.14″N 11°19′42.57″E
- Official language: Italian
- Remarks: Motto: veris quod possit vincere falsa ("that the false may be overcome by the true")

The Accademia dei Fisiocritici (also known as the Academy of Sciences) is a prominent scientific and scholarly society established in Siena in 1691. It publishes a journal, the Atti dell'Accademia delle Scienze di Siena detta de' Fisiocritici.

== Name and motto ==
The academy's name is a portmanteau of two Greek words: φύσις (nature) and κριτικοί (capable of judgment). The name underscored the academy's mission: the critical study of natural phenomena. The academy's motto was the Latin verse veris quod possit vincere falsa (that the false may be overcome by the true), taken from Lucretius' epic De rerum natura (IV. 481).

== History ==
The Accademia dei Fisiocritici was established on 17 March 1691 by Pirro Maria Gabrielli, professor of Theoretical Medicine and Botany at the University of Siena. Its first venue was the Hospital of Santa Maria della Scala, and its first principe was the mathematician Elia Astorini, a disciple of Borelli. Unlike Siena's traditional literary academies, such as the Accademia degli Intronati, the Accademia dei Fisiocritici focused exclusively on scientific research and took an anti-Aristotelian stance. From the outset, the Fisiocritici (Physiocritics) devoted themselves to scientific meetings, during which members would present the results of their research. Some of these sessions were open to the public, enabling people to engage with new scientific discoveries. The academy's earliest experiments, designed to demonstrate the existence of a vacuum, were conducted using an air pump inspired by the one built in 1658 by the English polymath Robert Hooke.

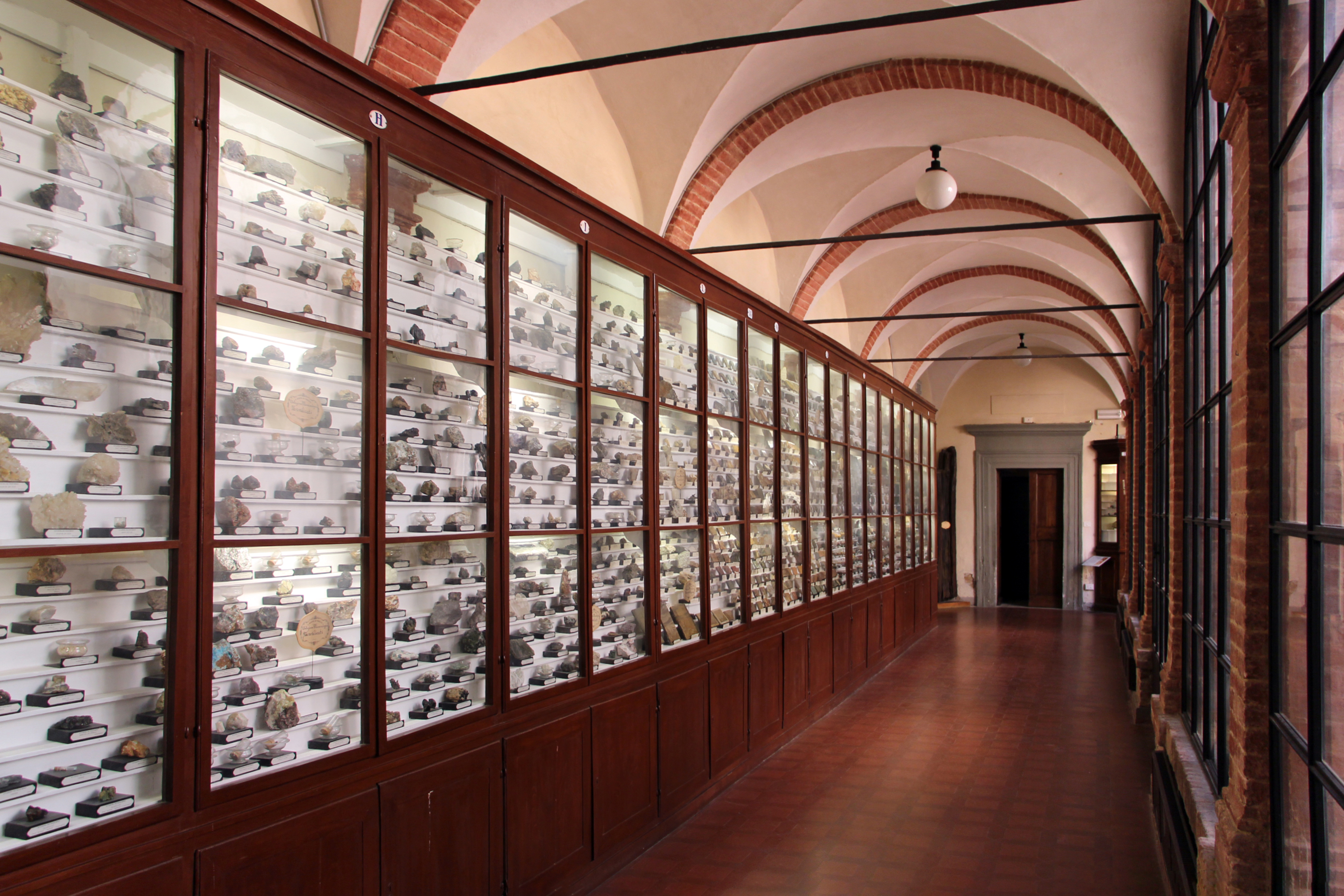
The mineralogy sector of the academy's museum

In the second half of the 18th century, the academy became a major hub for experimental research and scientific debate in Siena, earning it significant prestige throughout Europe. Its members included some of the era's most prominent scientists and intellectuals, including the Italians Algarotti, Ximenes, Spallanzani, Volta, Mascagni, Soldani, Morgagni and Lagrange, and the Europeans Linnaeus, Van Swieten and Cuvier. The Accademia dei Fisiocritici was one of the first scientific societies to admit women, electing the physicist Maria Angela Ardinghelli as a member in 1759. In 1761, the academy began publishing its Proceedings, one of Italy's earliest and longest-running scientific journals.

Since 1816, the academy has been housed in the 12th-century Camaldolese monastery of Santa Mustiola in Siena. The property was confiscated from the religious order during the French occupation of Tuscany and subsequently gifted to the Accademia dei Fisiocritici by Grand Duke Ferdinand III to serve as its permanent headquarters. The building houses the Museum of Natural History and the Library and the Historical Archive of the academy. The exhibition spaces in the cloister are arranged over two floors around a central courtyard; these are complemented by several rooms on the ground floor (including a large Great Hall, or Aula Magna), basement areas, and an elevated room on the first floor. A room displays the first life-size anatomical atlas conceived by Paolo Mascagni for his Anatomia Universa, posthumously published between 1823 and 1831.

== Bibliography ==
- De Gregorio, Mario (1998). "GABBRIELLI, Pirro Maria". Dizionario Biografico degli Italiani (in Italian). Vol. 51: Gabbiani–Gamba. Rome: Institute of the Italian Encyclopaedia. ISBN 978-88-12-00032-6.
- "La Storia". www.fisiocritici.it.
