= List of MeSH codes (C10) =

The following is a partial list of the "C" codes for Medical Subject Headings (MeSH), as defined by the United States National Library of Medicine (NLM).

This list continues the information at List of MeSH codes (C09). Codes following these are found at List of MeSH codes (C11). For other MeSH codes, see List of MeSH codes.

The content of this list is based on the MeSH Trees as maintained and updated annually by the NLM. The current version reflects the 2025 MeSH vocabulary, which includes ongoing revisions, new descriptors, and structural updates.

== MeSH C10 – nervous system diseases ==
=== MeSH C10.114 – autoimmune diseases of the nervous system ===
==== MeSH C10.114.375 – demyelinating autoimmune diseases, cns ====
- MeSH C10.114.375.112 – diffuse cerebral sclerosis of schilder
- MeSH C10.114.375.225 – encephalomyelitis, acute disseminated
- MeSH C10.114.375.362 – leukoencephalitis, acute hemorrhagic
- MeSH C10.114.375.500 – multiple sclerosis
- MeSH C10.114.375.500.200 – multiple sclerosis, chronic progressive
- MeSH C10.114.375.500.600 – multiple sclerosis, relapsing-remitting
- MeSH C10.114.375.500.650 – neuromyelitis optica
- MeSH C10.114.375.600 – myelitis, transverse
- MeSH C10.114.375.600.500 – neuromyelitis optica
- MeSH C10.114.375.650 – neuromyelitis optica

==== MeSH C10.114.656 – myasthenia gravis ====
- MeSH C10.114.656.300 – myasthenia gravis, autoimmune, experimental
- MeSH C10.114.656.650 – myasthenia gravis, neonatal

==== MeSH C10.114.703 – nervous system autoimmune disease, experimental ====
- MeSH C10.114.703.300 – encephalomyelitis, autoimmune, experimental
- MeSH C10.114.703.350 – myasthenia gravis, autoimmune, experimental
- MeSH C10.114.703.700 – neuritis, autoimmune, experimental

==== MeSH C10.114.750 – polyradiculoneuropathy ====
- MeSH C10.114.750.100 – guillain-barre syndrome
- MeSH C10.114.750.100.500 – miller fisher syndrome
- MeSH C10.114.750.137 – hereditary sensory and autonomic neuropathies
- MeSH C10.114.750.137.250 – dysautonomia, familial
- MeSH C10.114.750.175 – polyradiculoneuropathy, chronic inflammatory demyelinating

==== MeSH C10.114.875 – vasculitis, central nervous system ====
- MeSH C10.114.875.175 – aids arteritis, central nervous system
- MeSH C10.114.875.350 – lupus vasculitis, central nervous system
- MeSH C10.114.875.700 – temporal arteritis

=== MeSH C10.177 – autonomic nervous system diseases ===
==== MeSH C10.177.195 – complex regional pain syndromes ====
- MeSH C10.177.195.200 – causalgia
- MeSH C10.177.195.800 – reflex sympathetic dystrophy

=== MeSH C10.228 – central nervous system diseases ===
==== MeSH C10.228.140 – brain diseases ====
- MeSH C10.228.140.042 – akinetic mutism
- MeSH C10.228.140.055 – amblyopia
- MeSH C10.228.140.060 – amnesia, transient global
- MeSH C10.228.140.068 – auditory diseases, central
- MeSH C10.228.140.068.094 – auditory perceptual disorders
- MeSH C10.228.140.068.432 – hearing loss, central
- MeSH C10.228.140.079 – basal ganglia diseases
- MeSH C10.228.140.079.127 – basal ganglia cerebrovascular disease
- MeSH C10.228.140.079.127.500 – basal ganglia hemorrhage
- MeSH C10.228.140.079.127.500.500 – putaminal hemorrhage
- MeSH C10.228.140.079.294 – chorea gravidarum
- MeSH C10.228.140.079.357 – dystonia musculorum deformans
- MeSH C10.228.140.079.493 – hallervorden-spatz syndrome
- MeSH C10.228.140.079.501 – hepatolenticular degeneration
- MeSH C10.228.140.079.545 – huntington disease
- MeSH C10.228.140.079.590 – meige syndrome
- MeSH C10.228.140.079.612 – multiple system atrophy
- MeSH C10.228.140.079.612.600 – olivopontocerebellar atrophies
- MeSH C10.228.140.079.612.700 – shy-drager syndrome
- MeSH C10.228.140.079.612.800 – striatonigral degeneration
- MeSH C10.228.140.079.737 – neuroleptic malignant syndrome
- MeSH C10.228.140.079.862 – parkinsonian disorders
- MeSH C10.228.140.079.862.400 – lewy body disease
- MeSH C10.228.140.079.862.500 – parkinson disease
- MeSH C10.228.140.079.862.800 – parkinson disease, secondary
- MeSH C10.228.140.079.862.800.300 – mptp poisoning
- MeSH C10.228.140.079.862.800.600 – parkinson disease, postencephalitic
- MeSH C10.228.140.079.882 – supranuclear palsy, progressive
- MeSH C10.228.140.079.898 – tourette syndrome
- MeSH C10.228.140.116 – brain abscess
- MeSH C10.228.140.116.800 – toxoplasmosis, cerebral
- MeSH C10.228.140.140 – brain damage, chronic
- MeSH C10.228.140.140.127 – brain injury, chronic
- MeSH C10.228.140.140.254 – cerebral palsy
- MeSH C10.228.140.140.627 – persistent vegetative state
- MeSH C10.228.140.151 – brain death
- MeSH C10.228.140.163 – brain diseases, metabolic
- MeSH C10.228.140.163.100 – brain diseases, metabolic, inborn
- MeSH C10.228.140.163.100.050 – abetalipoproteinemia
- MeSH C10.228.140.163.100.162 – carbamoyl-phosphate synthase i deficiency disease
- MeSH C10.228.140.163.100.168 – cerebral amyloid angiopathy, familial
- MeSH C10.228.140.163.100.175 – citrullinemia
- MeSH C10.228.140.163.100.320 – galactosemias
- MeSH C10.228.140.163.100.355 – hartnup disease
- MeSH C10.228.140.163.100.360 – hepatolenticular degeneration
- MeSH C10.228.140.163.100.365 – homocystinuria
- MeSH C10.228.140.163.100.370 – hyperargininemia
- MeSH C10.228.140.163.100.375 – hyperglycinemia, nonketotic
- MeSH C10.228.140.163.100.380 – hyperlysinemias
- MeSH C10.228.140.163.100.412 – leigh disease
- MeSH C10.228.140.163.100.425 – lesch-nyhan syndrome
- MeSH C10.228.140.163.100.435 – lysosomal storage diseases, nervous system
- MeSH C10.228.140.163.100.435.295 – fucosidosis
- MeSH C10.228.140.163.100.435.340 – glycogen storage disease type ii
- MeSH C10.228.140.163.100.435.590 – mucolipidoses
- MeSH C10.228.140.163.100.435.810 – sialic acid storage disease
- MeSH C10.228.140.163.100.435.825 – sphingolipidoses
- MeSH C10.228.140.163.100.435.825.200 – fabry disease
- MeSH C10.228.140.163.100.435.825.300 – gangliosidoses
- MeSH C10.228.140.163.100.435.825.300.300 – gangliosidoses gm2
- MeSH C10.228.140.163.100.435.825.300.300.249 – sandhoff disease
- MeSH C10.228.140.163.100.435.825.300.300.500 – tay-sachs disease
- MeSH C10.228.140.163.100.435.825.300.300.750 – tay-sachs disease, ab variant
- MeSH C10.228.140.163.100.435.825.300.400 – gangliosidosis gm1
- MeSH C10.228.140.163.100.435.825.300.700 – sandhoff disease
- MeSH C10.228.140.163.100.435.825.400 – gaucher disease
- MeSH C10.228.140.163.100.435.825.590 – leukodystrophy, globoid cell
- MeSH C10.228.140.163.100.435.825.594 – leukodystrophy, metachromatic
- MeSH C10.228.140.163.100.435.825.700 – niemann-pick diseases
- MeSH C10.228.140.163.100.520 – maple syrup urine disease
- MeSH C10.228.140.163.100.535 – melas syndrome
- MeSH C10.228.140.163.100.540 – menkes kinky hair syndrome
- MeSH C10.228.140.163.100.545 – merrf syndrome
- MeSH C10.228.140.163.100.640 – oculocerebrorenal syndrome
- MeSH C10.228.140.163.100.650 – ornithine carbamoyltransferase deficiency disease
- MeSH C10.228.140.163.100.680 – peroxisomal disorders
- MeSH C10.228.140.163.100.680.100 – adrenoleukodystrophy
- MeSH C10.228.140.163.100.680.760 – refsum disease
- MeSH C10.228.140.163.100.680.970 – zellweger syndrome
- MeSH C10.228.140.163.100.687 – phenylketonurias
- MeSH C10.228.140.163.100.687.500 – phenylketonuria, maternal
- MeSH C10.228.140.163.100.725 – pyruvate carboxylase deficiency disease
- MeSH C10.228.140.163.100.750 – pyruvate dehydrogenase complex deficiency disease
- MeSH C10.228.140.163.100.875 – tyrosinemias
- MeSH C10.228.140.163.360 – hepatic encephalopathy
- MeSH C10.228.140.163.480 – kernicterus
- MeSH C10.228.140.163.540 – mitochondrial encephalomyopathies
- MeSH C10.228.140.163.560 – myelinolysis, central pontine
- MeSH C10.228.140.163.780 – reye syndrome
- MeSH C10.228.140.163.960 – wernicke encephalopathy
- MeSH C10.228.140.187 – brain edema
- MeSH C10.228.140.199 – brain injuries
- MeSH C10.228.140.199.250 – brain concussion
- MeSH C10.228.140.199.250.500 – post-concussion syndrome
- MeSH C10.228.140.199.275 – brain hemorrhage, traumatic
- MeSH C10.228.140.199.275.200 – brain stem hemorrhage, traumatic
- MeSH C10.228.140.199.275.300 – cerebral hemorrhage, traumatic
- MeSH C10.228.140.199.500 – brain injury, chronic
- MeSH C10.228.140.199.600 – diffuse axonal injury
- MeSH C10.228.140.199.650 – epilepsy, post-traumatic
- MeSH C10.228.140.199.700 – pneumocephalus
- MeSH C10.228.140.211 – brain neoplasms
- MeSH C10.228.140.211.280 – cerebral ventricle neoplasms
- MeSH C10.228.140.211.280.300 – choroid plexus neoplasms
- MeSH C10.228.140.211.280.300.500 – papilloma, choroid plexus
- MeSH C10.228.140.211.500 – infratentorial neoplasms
- MeSH C10.228.140.211.500.100 – brain stem neoplasms
- MeSH C10.228.140.211.500.200 – cerebellar neoplasms
- MeSH C10.228.140.211.692 – neurocytoma
- MeSH C10.228.140.211.788 – pinealoma
- MeSH C10.228.140.211.885 – supratentorial neoplasms
- MeSH C10.228.140.211.885.500 – hypothalamic neoplasms
- MeSH C10.228.140.211.885.500.600 – pituitary neoplasms
- MeSH C10.228.140.252 – cerebellar diseases
- MeSH C10.228.140.252.190 – cerebellar ataxia
- MeSH C10.228.140.252.190.530 – spinocerebellar ataxias
- MeSH C10.228.140.252.190.530.060 – ataxia telangiectasia
- MeSH C10.228.140.252.190.530.530 – machado-joseph disease
- MeSH C10.228.140.252.200 – cerebellar neoplasms
- MeSH C10.228.140.252.300 – dandy-walker syndrome
- MeSH C10.228.140.252.500 – miller fisher syndrome
- MeSH C10.228.140.252.620 – paraneoplastic cerebellar degeneration
- MeSH C10.228.140.252.700 – spinocerebellar degenerations
- MeSH C10.228.140.252.700.150 – friedreich ataxia
- MeSH C10.228.140.252.700.250 – myoclonic cerebellar dyssynergia
- MeSH C10.228.140.252.700.650 – olivopontocerebellar atrophies
- MeSH C10.228.140.252.700.700 – spinocerebellar ataxias
- MeSH C10.228.140.252.700.700.500 – machado-joseph disease
- MeSH C10.228.140.300 – cerebrovascular disorders
- MeSH C10.228.140.300.100 – basal ganglia cerebrovascular disease
- MeSH C10.228.140.300.100.200 – basal ganglia hemorrhage
- MeSH C10.228.140.300.100.200.500 – putaminal hemorrhage
- MeSH C10.228.140.300.150 – brain ischemia
- MeSH C10.228.140.300.150.956 – vertebrobasilar insufficiency
- MeSH C10.228.140.300.150.956.700 – subclavian steal syndrome
- MeSH C10.228.140.300.200 – carotid artery diseases
- MeSH C10.228.140.300.200.331 – carotid artery thrombosis
- MeSH C10.228.140.300.200.345 – carotid artery injuries
- MeSH C10.228.140.300.200.345.300 – carotid artery, internal, dissection
- MeSH C10.228.140.300.200.345.350 – carotid-cavernous sinus fistula
- MeSH C10.228.140.300.200.353 – carotid artery, internal, dissection
- MeSH C10.228.140.300.200.360 – carotid stenosis
- MeSH C10.228.140.300.200.490 – carotid-cavernous sinus fistula
- MeSH C10.228.140.300.200.600 – moyamoya disease
- MeSH C10.228.140.300.301 – cerebrovascular accident
- MeSH C10.228.140.300.301.200 – brain infarction
- MeSH C10.228.140.300.301.200.100 – brain stem infarctions
- MeSH C10.228.140.300.301.200.100.500 – lateral medullary syndrome
- MeSH C10.228.140.300.301.200.200 – cerebral infarction
- MeSH C10.228.140.300.301.200.200.400 – infarction, anterior cerebral artery
- MeSH C10.228.140.300.301.200.200.450 – infarction, middle cerebral artery
- MeSH C10.228.140.300.301.200.200.475 – infarction, posterior cerebral artery
- MeSH C10.228.140.300.350 – cerebrovascular trauma
- MeSH C10.228.140.300.350.500 – carotid artery injuries
- MeSH C10.228.140.300.350.500.300 – carotid artery, internal, dissection
- MeSH C10.228.140.300.350.500.350 – carotid-cavernous sinus fistula
- MeSH C10.228.140.300.350.875 – vertebral artery dissection
- MeSH C10.228.140.300.400 – dementia, vascular
- MeSH C10.228.140.300.400.203 – cadasil
- MeSH C10.228.140.300.400.408 – dementia, multi-infarct
- MeSH C10.228.140.300.451 – hypoxia-ischemia, brain
- MeSH C10.228.140.300.451.200 – brain ischemia
- MeSH C10.228.140.300.451.200.400 – ischemic attack, transient
- MeSH C10.228.140.300.451.400 – hypoxia, brain
- MeSH C10.228.140.300.510 – intracranial arterial diseases
- MeSH C10.228.140.300.510.200 – cerebral arterial diseases
- MeSH C10.228.140.300.510.200.175 – cadasil
- MeSH C10.228.140.300.510.200.200 – cerebral amyloid angiopathy
- MeSH C10.228.140.300.510.200.200.160 – cerebral amyloid angiopathy, familial
- MeSH C10.228.140.300.510.200.325 – infarction, anterior cerebral artery
- MeSH C10.228.140.300.510.200.387 – infarction, middle cerebral artery
- MeSH C10.228.140.300.510.200.418 – infarction, posterior cerebral artery
- MeSH C10.228.140.300.510.200.450 – intracranial aneurysm
- MeSH C10.228.140.300.510.200.475 – intracranial arteriosclerosis
- MeSH C10.228.140.300.510.200.475.500 – dementia, vascular
- MeSH C10.228.140.300.510.400 – intracranial arteriovenous malformations
- MeSH C10.228.140.300.520 – intracranial arteriovenous malformations
- MeSH C10.228.140.300.525 – intracranial embolism and thrombosis
- MeSH C10.228.140.300.525.400 – intracranial embolism
- MeSH C10.228.140.300.525.425 – intracranial thrombosis
- MeSH C10.228.140.300.525.669 – sinus thrombosis, intracranial
- MeSH C10.228.140.300.525.669.375 – cavernous sinus thrombosis
- MeSH C10.228.140.300.525.669.562 – lateral sinus thrombosis
- MeSH C10.228.140.300.525.669.750 – sagittal sinus thrombosis
- MeSH C10.228.140.300.535 – intracranial hemorrhages
- MeSH C10.228.140.300.535.200 – cerebral hemorrhage
- MeSH C10.228.140.300.535.200.150 – basal ganglia hemorrhage
- MeSH C10.228.140.300.535.200.150.500 – putaminal hemorrhage
- MeSH C10.228.140.300.535.200.200 – cerebral hemorrhage, traumatic
- MeSH C10.228.140.300.535.325 – intracranial hemorrhage, hypertensive
- MeSH C10.228.140.300.535.450 – intracranial hemorrhage, traumatic
- MeSH C10.228.140.300.535.450.200 – brain hemorrhage, traumatic
- MeSH C10.228.140.300.535.450.200.500 – brain stem hemorrhage, traumatic
- MeSH C10.228.140.300.535.450.200.750 – cerebral hemorrhage, traumatic
- MeSH C10.228.140.300.535.450.300 – hematoma, epidural, cranial
- MeSH C10.228.140.300.535.450.400 – hematoma, subdural
- MeSH C10.228.140.300.535.450.400.050 – hematoma, subdural, acute
- MeSH C10.228.140.300.535.450.400.120 – hematoma, subdural, chronic
- MeSH C10.228.140.300.535.450.400.400 – hematoma, subdural, intracranial
- MeSH C10.228.140.300.535.450.650 – subarachnoid hemorrhage, traumatic
- MeSH C10.228.140.300.535.625 – pituitary apoplexy
- MeSH C10.228.140.300.535.800 – subarachnoid hemorrhage
- MeSH C10.228.140.300.535.800.700 – subarachnoid hemorrhage, traumatic
- MeSH C10.228.140.300.700 – leukomalacia, periventricular
- MeSH C10.228.140.300.750 – sneddon syndrome
- MeSH C10.228.140.300.800 – vascular headaches
- MeSH C10.228.140.300.850 – vasculitis, central nervous system
- MeSH C10.228.140.300.850.125 – aids arteritis, central nervous system
- MeSH C10.228.140.300.850.250 – lupus vasculitis, central nervous system
- MeSH C10.228.140.300.850.500 – temporal arteritis
- MeSH C10.228.140.300.900 – vasospasm, intracranial
- MeSH C10.228.140.300.950 – vertebral artery dissection
- MeSH C10.228.140.380 – dementia
- MeSH C10.228.140.380.070 – aids dementia complex
- MeSH C10.228.140.380.100 – alzheimer disease
- MeSH C10.228.140.380.132 – primary progressive aphasia
- MeSH C10.228.140.380.165 – creutzfeldt-jakob syndrome
- MeSH C10.228.140.380.230 – dementia, vascular
- MeSH C10.228.140.380.230.250 – dementia, multi-infarct
- MeSH C10.228.140.380.278 – huntington disease
- MeSH C10.228.140.380.326 – Klüver-Bucy syndrome
- MeSH C10.228.140.380.422 – lewy body disease
- MeSH C10.228.140.380.615 – pick disease of the brain
- MeSH C10.228.140.400 – diffuse cerebral sclerosis of schilder
- MeSH C10.228.140.430 – encephalitis
- MeSH C10.228.140.430.500 – encephalomyelitis
- MeSH C10.228.140.430.525 – limbic encephalitis
- MeSH C10.228.140.430.550 – meningoencephalitis
- MeSH C10.228.140.430.550.500 – lupus vasculitis, central nervous system
- MeSH C10.228.140.461 – encephalomalacia
- MeSH C10.228.140.461.550 – leukomalacia, periventricular
- MeSH C10.228.140.490 – epilepsy
- MeSH C10.228.140.490.250 – epilepsies, myoclonic
- MeSH C10.228.140.490.250.300 – myoclonic epilepsy, juvenile
- MeSH C10.228.140.490.250.650 – myoclonic epilepsies, progressive
- MeSH C10.228.140.490.250.650.500 – lafora disease
- MeSH C10.228.140.490.250.650.700 – merrf syndrome
- MeSH C10.228.140.490.250.650.900 – unverricht-lundborg syndrome
- MeSH C10.228.140.490.360 – epilepsies, partial
- MeSH C10.228.140.490.360.260 – epilepsy, complex partial
- MeSH C10.228.140.490.360.270 – epilepsy, frontal lobe
- MeSH C10.228.140.490.360.272 – epilepsy, partial, motor
- MeSH C10.228.140.490.360.275 – epilepsy, partial, sensory
- MeSH C10.228.140.490.360.280 – epilepsy, rolandic
- MeSH C10.228.140.490.360.290 – epilepsy, temporal lobe
- MeSH C10.228.140.490.370 – epilepsy, benign neonatal
- MeSH C10.228.140.490.375 – epilepsy, generalized
- MeSH C10.228.140.490.375.260 – epilepsy, absence
- MeSH C10.228.140.490.375.290 – epilepsy, tonic-clonic
- MeSH C10.228.140.490.375.760 – spasms, infantile
- MeSH C10.228.140.490.380 – epilepsy, post-traumatic
- MeSH C10.228.140.490.450 – epilepsy, reflex
- MeSH C10.228.140.490.535 – landau-kleffner syndrome
- MeSH C10.228.140.490.631 – seizures
- MeSH C10.228.140.490.650 – seizures, febrile
- MeSH C10.228.140.490.690 – status epilepticus
- MeSH C10.228.140.490.690.260 – epilepsia partialis continua
- MeSH C10.228.140.546 – headache disorders
- MeSH C10.228.140.546.399 – headache disorders, primary
- MeSH C10.228.140.546.399.750 – migraine disorders
- MeSH C10.228.140.546.399.750.250 – migraine with aura
- MeSH C10.228.140.546.399.750.450 – migraine without aura
- MeSH C10.228.140.546.399.875 – tension-type headache
- MeSH C10.228.140.546.399.937 – trigeminal autonomic cephalalgias
- MeSH C10.228.140.546.399.937.500 – cluster headache
- MeSH C10.228.140.546.399.937.750 – paroxysmal hemicrania
- MeSH C10.228.140.546.399.937.875 – sunct syndrome
- MeSH C10.228.140.546.699 – headache disorders, secondary
- MeSH C10.228.140.546.699.124 – post-dural puncture headache
- MeSH C10.228.140.546.699.249 – post-traumatic headache
- MeSH C10.228.140.546.699.500 – vascular headaches
- MeSH C10.228.140.602 – hydrocephalus
- MeSH C10.228.140.602.288 – dandy-walker syndrome
- MeSH C10.228.140.602.559 – hydrocephalus, normal pressure
- MeSH C10.228.140.617 – hypothalamic diseases
- MeSH C10.228.140.617.200 – bardet-biedl syndrome
- MeSH C10.228.140.617.477 – hypothalamic neoplasms
- MeSH C10.228.140.617.477.600 – pituitary neoplasms
- MeSH C10.228.140.617.500 – laurence-moon syndrome
- MeSH C10.228.140.617.738 – pituitary diseases
- MeSH C10.228.140.617.738.200 – empty sella syndrome
- MeSH C10.228.140.617.738.250 – hyperpituitarism
- MeSH C10.228.140.617.738.250.100 – acromegaly
- MeSH C10.228.140.617.738.250.450 – hyperprolactinemia
- MeSH C10.228.140.617.738.250.725 – pituitary acth hypersecretion
- MeSH C10.228.140.617.738.300 – hypopituitarism
- MeSH C10.228.140.617.738.300.300 – dwarfism, pituitary
- MeSH C10.228.140.617.738.320 – inappropriate adh syndrome
- MeSH C10.228.140.617.738.350 – pituitary apoplexy
- MeSH C10.228.140.617.738.675 – pituitary neoplasms
- MeSH C10.228.140.617.738.675.149 – acth-secreting pituitary adenoma
- MeSH C10.228.140.617.738.675.149.500 – nelson syndrome
- MeSH C10.228.140.617.738.675.299 – growth hormone-secreting pituitary adenoma
- MeSH C10.228.140.617.738.675.800 – prolactinoma
- MeSH C10.228.140.631 – intracranial hypertension
- MeSH C10.228.140.631.450 – hydrocephalus
- MeSH C10.228.140.631.450.500 – dandy-walker syndrome
- MeSH C10.228.140.631.500 – hypertensive encephalopathy
- MeSH C10.228.140.631.750 – pseudotumor cerebri
- MeSH C10.228.140.638 – intracranial hypotension
- MeSH C10.228.140.646 – kluver-Bucy syndrome
- MeSH C10.228.140.744 – neuroaxonal dystrophies
- MeSH C10.228.140.744.320 – hallervorden-spatz syndrome
- MeSH C10.228.140.870 – subdural effusion
- MeSH C10.228.140.915 – thalamic diseases

==== MeSH C10.228.228 – central nervous system infections ====
- MeSH C10.228.228.090 – brain abscess
- MeSH C10.228.228.090.800 – toxoplasmosis, cerebral
- MeSH C10.228.228.180 – central nervous system bacterial infections
- MeSH C10.228.228.180.100 – brain abscess
- MeSH C10.228.228.180.350 – empyema, subdural
- MeSH C10.228.228.180.375 – epidural abscess
- MeSH C10.228.228.180.437 – lyme neuroborreliosis
- MeSH C10.228.228.180.500 – meningitis, bacterial
- MeSH C10.228.228.180.500.350 – meningitis, escherichia coli
- MeSH C10.228.228.180.500.425 – meningitis, haemophilus
- MeSH C10.228.228.180.500.500 – meningitis, listeria
- MeSH C10.228.228.180.500.750 – meningitis, meningococcal
- MeSH C10.228.228.180.500.750.500 – waterhouse-friderichsen syndrome
- MeSH C10.228.228.180.500.875 – meningitis, pneumococcal
- MeSH C10.228.228.180.500.937 – tuberculosis, meningeal
- MeSH C10.228.228.180.600 – neurosyphilis
- MeSH C10.228.228.180.600.800 – tabes dorsalis
- MeSH C10.228.228.180.850 – tuberculosis, central nervous system
- MeSH C10.228.228.180.850.400 – tuberculoma, intracranial
- MeSH C10.228.228.180.850.800 – tuberculosis, meningeal
- MeSH C10.228.228.198 – central nervous system fungal infections
- MeSH C10.228.228.198.500 – meningitis, fungal
- MeSH C10.228.228.198.500.500 – meningitis, cryptococcal
- MeSH C10.228.228.198.750 – neuroaspergillosis
- MeSH C10.228.228.205 – central nervous system parasitic infections
- MeSH C10.228.228.205.250 – central nervous system helminthiasis
- MeSH C10.228.228.205.250.550 – neurocysticercosis
- MeSH C10.228.228.205.250.600 – neuroschistosomiasis
- MeSH C10.228.228.205.300 – central nervous system protozoal infections
- MeSH C10.228.228.205.300.500 – malaria, cerebral
- MeSH C10.228.228.205.300.800 – toxoplasmosis, cerebral
- MeSH C10.228.228.205.300.900 – toxoplasmosis, congenital
- MeSH C10.228.228.210 – central nervous system viral diseases
- MeSH C10.228.228.210.150 – encephalitis
- MeSH C10.228.228.210.150.300 – encephalitis, viral
- MeSH C10.228.228.210.150.300.300 – encephalitis, arbovirus
- MeSH C10.228.228.210.150.300.300.200 – encephalitis, california
- MeSH C10.228.228.210.150.300.300.400 – encephalitis, japanese
- MeSH C10.228.228.210.150.300.300.550 – encephalitis, st. louis
- MeSH C10.228.228.210.150.300.300.775 – encephalitis, tick-borne
- MeSH C10.228.228.210.150.300.300.887 – west nile fever
- MeSH C10.228.228.210.150.300.350 – encephalitis, herpes simplex
- MeSH C10.228.228.210.150.300.400 – encephalitis, varicella zoster
- MeSH C10.228.228.210.150.300.450 – encephalomyelitis, equine
- MeSH C10.228.228.210.150.300.450.200 – encephalomyelitis, eastern equine
- MeSH C10.228.228.210.150.300.450.600 – encephalomyelitis, venezuelan equine
- MeSH C10.228.228.210.150.300.450.800 – encephalomyelitis, western equine
- MeSH C10.228.228.210.150.300.500 – leukoencephalopathy, progressive multifocal
- MeSH C10.228.228.210.150.300.600 – subacute sclerosing panencephalitis
- MeSH C10.228.228.210.500 – meningitis, viral
- MeSH C10.228.228.210.500.500 – lymphocytic choriomeningitis
- MeSH C10.228.228.210.500.600 – meningitis, aseptic
- MeSH C10.228.228.210.575 – myelitis
- MeSH C10.228.228.210.575.500 – paraparesis, tropical spastic
- MeSH C10.228.228.210.575.750 – poliomyelitis
- MeSH C10.228.228.210.650 – poliomyelitis
- MeSH C10.228.228.210.650.600 – poliomyelitis, bulbar
- MeSH C10.228.228.210.650.800 – postpoliomyelitis syndrome
- MeSH C10.228.228.210.710 – pseudorabies
- MeSH C10.228.228.227 – empyema, subdural
- MeSH C10.228.228.245 – encephalitis
- MeSH C10.228.228.245.340 – encephalitis, viral
- MeSH C10.228.228.245.340.310 – encephalitis, arbovirus
- MeSH C10.228.228.245.340.310.140 – encephalitis, california
- MeSH C10.228.228.245.340.310.280 – encephalitis, japanese
- MeSH C10.228.228.245.340.310.406 – encephalitis, st. louis
- MeSH C10.228.228.245.340.310.500 – encephalitis, tick-borne
- MeSH C10.228.228.245.340.310.950 – west nile fever
- MeSH C10.228.228.245.340.332 – encephalitis, herpes simplex
- MeSH C10.228.228.245.340.355 – encephalitis, varicella zoster
- MeSH C10.228.228.245.340.450 – encephalomyelitis, equine
- MeSH C10.228.228.245.340.450.200 – encephalomyelitis, eastern equine
- MeSH C10.228.228.245.340.450.225 – encephalomyelitis, venezuelan equine
- MeSH C10.228.228.245.340.450.250 – encephalomyelitis, western equine
- MeSH C10.228.228.245.340.575 – leukoencephalopathy, progressive multifocal
- MeSH C10.228.228.245.340.700 – subacute sclerosing panencephalitis
- MeSH C10.228.228.245.550 – meningoencephalitis
- MeSH C10.228.228.245.550.500 – lupus vasculitis, central nervous system
- MeSH C10.228.228.245.670 – leukoencephalitis, acute hemorrhagic
- MeSH C10.228.228.245.700 – limbic encephalitis
- MeSH C10.228.228.291 – encephalomyelitis
- MeSH C10.228.228.291.323 – encephalomyelitis, equine
- MeSH C10.228.228.291.323.162 – encephalomyelitis, eastern equine
- MeSH C10.228.228.291.323.325 – encephalomyelitis, venezuelan equine
- MeSH C10.228.228.291.323.662 – encephalomyelitis, western equine
- MeSH C10.228.228.300 – epidural abscess
- MeSH C10.228.228.507 – meningitis
- MeSH C10.228.228.507.097 – arachnoiditis
- MeSH C10.228.228.507.220 – meningitis, aseptic
- MeSH C10.228.228.507.280 – meningitis, bacterial
- MeSH C10.228.228.507.280.350 – meningitis, escherichia coli
- MeSH C10.228.228.507.280.393 – meningitis, haemophilus
- MeSH C10.228.228.507.280.449 – meningitis, listeria
- MeSH C10.228.228.507.280.505 – meningitis, meningococcal
- MeSH C10.228.228.507.280.505.904 – waterhouse-friderichsen syndrome
- MeSH C10.228.228.507.280.560 – meningitis, pneumococcal
- MeSH C10.228.228.507.280.915 – tuberculosis, meningeal
- MeSH C10.228.228.507.400 – meningitis, fungal
- MeSH C10.228.228.507.400.500 – meningitis, cryptococcal
- MeSH C10.228.228.507.700 – meningitis, viral
- MeSH C10.228.228.507.700.500 – lymphocytic choriomeningitis
- MeSH C10.228.228.507.700.600 – meningitis, aseptic
- MeSH C10.228.228.507.850 – meningoencephalitis
- MeSH C10.228.228.507.850.500 – lupus vasculitis, central nervous system
- MeSH C10.228.228.553 – meningoencephalitis
- MeSH C10.228.228.553.450 – lupus vasculitis, central nervous system
- MeSH C10.228.228.553.900 – uveomeningoencephalitic syndrome
- MeSH C10.228.228.618 – myelitis
- MeSH C10.228.228.618.700 – paraparesis, tropical spastic
- MeSH C10.228.228.618.850 – poliomyelitis
- MeSH C10.228.228.709 – perimeningeal infections
- MeSH C10.228.228.709.300 – empyema, subdural
- MeSH C10.228.228.709.350 – epidural abscess
- MeSH C10.228.228.709.675 – subdural effusion
- MeSH C10.228.228.800 – prion diseases
- MeSH C10.228.228.800.230 – creutzfeldt-jakob syndrome
- MeSH C10.228.228.800.260 – encephalopathy, bovine spongiform
- MeSH C10.228.228.800.350 – gerstmann-straussler-scheinker disease
- MeSH C10.228.228.800.392 – insomnia, fatal familial
- MeSH C10.228.228.800.435 – Kuru
- MeSH C10.228.228.800.717 – scrapie
- MeSH C10.228.228.800.858 – wasting disease, chronic

==== MeSH C10.228.440 – encephalomyelitis ====
- MeSH C10.228.440.406 – encephalomyelitis, equine
- MeSH C10.228.440.406.200 – encephalomyelitis, eastern equine
- MeSH C10.228.440.406.225 – encephalomyelitis, venezuelan equine
- MeSH C10.228.440.406.250 – encephalomyelitis, western equine
- MeSH C10.228.440.600 – fatigue syndrome, chronic
- MeSH C10.228.440.650 – leukoencephalitis, acute hemorrhagic

==== MeSH C10.228.566 – meningitis ====
- MeSH C10.228.566.500 – meningoencephalitis
- MeSH C10.228.566.500.500 – lupus vasculitis, central nervous system

==== MeSH C10.228.662 – movement disorders ====
- MeSH C10.228.662.075 – angelman syndrome
- MeSH C10.228.662.150 – choreatic disorders
- MeSH C10.228.662.150.500 – chorea gravidarum
- MeSH C10.228.662.150.550 – huntington disease
- MeSH C10.228.662.300 – dystonic disorders
- MeSH C10.228.662.300.200 – dystonia musculorum deformans
- MeSH C10.228.662.300.500 – meige syndrome
- MeSH C10.228.662.300.750 – torticollis
- MeSH C10.228.662.350 – essential tremor
- MeSH C10.228.662.400 – hallervorden-spatz syndrome
- MeSH C10.228.662.425 – hepatolenticular degeneration
- MeSH C10.228.662.550 – multiple system atrophy
- MeSH C10.228.662.550.600 – olivopontocerebellar atrophies
- MeSH C10.228.662.550.700 – shy-drager syndrome
- MeSH C10.228.662.550.800 – striatonigral degeneration
- MeSH C10.228.662.600 – parkinsonian disorders
- MeSH C10.228.662.600.200 – lewy body disease
- MeSH C10.228.662.600.400 – parkinson disease
- MeSH C10.228.662.600.700 – parkinson disease, secondary
- MeSH C10.228.662.600.700.250 – mptp poisoning
- MeSH C10.228.662.600.700.500 – parkinson disease, postencephalitic
- MeSH C10.228.662.700 – supranuclear palsy, progressive
- MeSH C10.228.662.825 – Tic disorders
- MeSH C10.228.662.825.800 – Tourette syndrome

==== MeSH C10.228.854 – spinal cord diseases ====
- MeSH C10.228.854.139 – amyotrophic lateral sclerosis
- MeSH C10.228.854.303 – epidural abscess
- MeSH C10.228.854.468 – muscular atrophy, spinal
- MeSH C10.228.854.468.800 – spinal muscular atrophies of childhood
- MeSH C10.228.854.525 – myelitis
- MeSH C10.228.854.525.553 – myelitis, transverse
- MeSH C10.228.854.525.700 – paraparesis, tropical spastic
- MeSH C10.228.854.525.850 – poliomyelitis
- MeSH C10.228.854.641 – poliomyelitis
- MeSH C10.228.854.641.650 – postpoliomyelitis syndrome
- MeSH C10.228.854.761 – spinal cord compression
- MeSH C10.228.854.765 – spinal cord neoplasms
- MeSH C10.228.854.765.342 – epidural neoplasms
- MeSH C10.228.854.770 – spinal cord injuries
- MeSH C10.228.854.770.500 – central cord syndrome
- MeSH C10.228.854.785 – spinal cord vascular diseases
- MeSH C10.228.854.785.100 – anterior spinal artery syndrome
- MeSH C10.228.854.785.650 – spinal cord ischemia
- MeSH C10.228.854.785.650.100 – anterior spinal artery syndrome
- MeSH C10.228.854.787 – spinocerebellar degenerations
- MeSH C10.228.854.787.200 – friedreich ataxia
- MeSH C10.228.854.787.500 – myoclonic cerebellar dyssynergia
- MeSH C10.228.854.787.750 – olivopontocerebellar atrophies
- MeSH C10.228.854.787.875 – spinocerebellar ataxias
- MeSH C10.228.854.787.875.500 – machado-joseph disease
- MeSH C10.228.854.790 – stiff-person syndrome
- MeSH C10.228.854.833 – syringomyelia
- MeSH C10.228.854.889 – tabes dorsalis

=== MeSH C10.292 – cranial nerve diseases ===
==== MeSH C10.292.150 – abducens nerve diseases ====
- MeSH C10.292.150.100 – abducens nerve injury

==== MeSH C10.292.225 – cranial nerve neoplasms ====
- MeSH C10.292.225.750 – neuroma, acoustic
- MeSH C10.292.225.750.500 – neurofibromatosis 2
- MeSH C10.292.225.800 – optic nerve neoplasms
- MeSH C10.292.225.800.500 – optic nerve glioma

==== MeSH C10.292.262 – cranial nerve injuries ====
- MeSH C10.292.262.200 – abducens nerve injury
- MeSH C10.292.262.500 – facial nerve injuries
- MeSH C10.292.262.750 – optic nerve injuries

==== MeSH C10.292.300 – facial nerve diseases ====
- MeSH C10.292.300.250 – bell palsy
- MeSH C10.292.300.375 – facial hemiatrophy
- MeSH C10.292.300.500 – facial nerve injuries
- MeSH C10.292.300.625 – facial neuralgia
- MeSH C10.292.300.750 – herpes zoster oticus
- MeSH C10.292.300.800 – melkersson-rosenthal syndrome
- MeSH C10.292.300.825 – mobius syndrome

==== MeSH C10.292.562 – ocular motility disorders ====
- MeSH C10.292.562.250 – duane retraction syndrome
- MeSH C10.292.562.350 – miller fisher syndrome
- MeSH C10.292.562.675 – nystagmus, pathologic
- MeSH C10.292.562.675.300 – nystagmus, congenital
- MeSH C10.292.562.700 – oculomotor nerve diseases
- MeSH C10.292.562.750 – ophthalmoplegia
- MeSH C10.292.562.750.250 – ophthalmoplegia, chronic progressive external
- MeSH C10.292.562.750.500 – supranuclear palsy, progressive
- MeSH C10.292.562.775 – ophthalmoplegia, chronic progressive external
- MeSH C10.292.562.775.500 – kearns-sayer syndrome
- MeSH C10.292.562.887 – strabismus
- MeSH C10.292.562.887.300 – esotropia
- MeSH C10.292.562.887.650 – exotropia
- MeSH C10.292.562.900 – tolosa-hunt syndrome

==== MeSH C10.292.600 – oculomotor nerve diseases ====
- MeSH C10.292.600.200 – aide syndrome

==== MeSH C10.292.650 – olfactory nerve diseases ====
- MeSH C10.292.650.200 – esthesioneuroblastoma, olfactory

==== MeSH C10.292.700 – optic nerve diseases ====
- MeSH C10.292.700.225 – optic atrophy
- MeSH C10.292.700.225.500 – optic atrophies, hereditary
- MeSH C10.292.700.225.500.400 – optic atrophy, hereditary, leber
- MeSH C10.292.700.225.500.500 – optic atrophy, autosomal dominant
- MeSH C10.292.700.225.500.980 – wolfram syndrome
- MeSH C10.292.700.450 – optic disk drusen
- MeSH C10.292.700.475 – optic nerve injuries
- MeSH C10.292.700.500 – optic nerve neoplasms
- MeSH C10.292.700.500.500 – optic nerve glioma
- MeSH C10.292.700.550 – optic neuritis
- MeSH C10.292.700.550.500 – neuromyelitis optica
- MeSH C10.292.700.600 – optic neuropathy, ischemic
- MeSH C10.292.700.900 – papilledema

==== MeSH C10.292.775 – trigeminal nerve diseases ====
- MeSH C10.292.775.700 – trigeminal neuralgia

==== MeSH C10.292.887 – vagus nerve diseases ====
- MeSH C10.292.887.800 – vocal cord paralysis

==== MeSH C10.292.910 – vestibulocochlear nerve diseases ====
- MeSH C10.292.910.600 – neuroma, acoustic
- MeSH C10.292.910.600.500 – neurofibromatosis 2
- MeSH C10.292.910.850 – vestibular neuronitis

=== MeSH C10.314 – demyelinating diseases ===
==== MeSH C10.314.350 – demyelinating autoimmune diseases, cns ====
- MeSH C10.314.350.112 – diffuse cerebral sclerosis of schilder
- MeSH C10.314.350.225 – encephalomyelitis, acute disseminated
- MeSH C10.314.350.250 – encephalomyelitis, autoimmune, experimental
- MeSH C10.314.350.375 – leukoencephalitis, acute hemorrhagic
- MeSH C10.314.350.500 – multiple sclerosis
- MeSH C10.314.350.500.200 – multiple sclerosis, chronic progressive
- MeSH C10.314.350.500.600 – multiple sclerosis, relapsing-remitting
- MeSH C10.314.350.500.650 – neuromyelitis optica
- MeSH C10.314.350.600 – myelitis, transverse
- MeSH C10.314.350.600.500 – neuromyelitis optica
- MeSH C10.314.350.650 – neuromyelitis optica

==== MeSH C10.314.400 – hereditary central nervous system demyelinating diseases ====
- MeSH C10.314.400.250 – adrenoleukodystrophy
- MeSH C10.314.400.312 – alexander disease
- MeSH C10.314.400.375 – canavan disease
- MeSH C10.314.400.500 – leukodystrophy, globoid cell
- MeSH C10.314.400.550 – leukodystrophy, metachromatic
- MeSH C10.314.400.775 – pelizaeus-merzbacher disease

==== MeSH C10.314.750 – polyradiculoneuropathy ====
- MeSH C10.314.750.300 – polyradiculoneuropathy, chronic inflammatory demyelinating
- MeSH C10.314.750.450 – guillain-barre syndrome
- MeSH C10.314.750.450.500 – miller fisher syndrome
- MeSH C10.314.750.600 – hereditary sensory and autonomic neuropathies
- MeSH C10.314.750.600.250 – dysautonomia, familial

=== MeSH C10.500 – nervous system malformations ===
==== MeSH C10.500.142 – central nervous system cysts ====
- MeSH C10.500.142.100 – arachnoid cysts

==== MeSH C10.500.190 – central nervous system vascular malformations ====
- MeSH C10.500.190.200 – hemangioma, cavernous, central nervous system
- MeSH C10.500.190.600 – central nervous system venous angioma
- MeSH C10.500.190.800 – sinus pericranii

==== MeSH C10.500.300 – hereditary motor and sensory neuropathies ====
- MeSH C10.500.300.200 – charcot-marie-tooth disease
- MeSH C10.500.300.780 – refsum disease
- MeSH C10.500.300.820 – spastic paraplegia, hereditary

==== MeSH C10.500.310 – hereditary sensory and autonomic neuropathies ====
- MeSH C10.500.310.309 – dysautonomia, familial

==== MeSH C10.500.680 – neural tube defects ====
- MeSH C10.500.680.196 – anencephaly
- MeSH C10.500.680.291 – arnold-chiari malformation
- MeSH C10.500.680.488 – encephalocele
- MeSH C10.500.680.598 – meningocele
- MeSH C10.500.680.610 – meningomyelocele
- MeSH C10.500.680.800 – spinal dysraphism
- MeSH C10.500.680.800.730 – spina bifida cystica
- MeSH C10.500.680.800.750 – spina bifida occulta

=== MeSH C10.551 – nervous system neoplasms ===
==== MeSH C10.551.240 – central nervous system neoplasms ====
- MeSH C10.551.240.250 – brain neoplasms
- MeSH C10.551.240.250.200 – cerebral ventricle neoplasms
- MeSH C10.551.240.250.200.200 – choroid plexus neoplasms
- MeSH C10.551.240.250.200.200.500 – papilloma, choroid plexus
- MeSH C10.551.240.250.400 – infratentorial neoplasms
- MeSH C10.551.240.250.400.200 – brain stem neoplasms
- MeSH C10.551.240.250.400.300 – cerebellar neoplasms
- MeSH C10.551.240.250.550 – neurocytoma
- MeSH C10.551.240.250.625 – pinealoma
- MeSH C10.551.240.250.700 – supratentorial neoplasms
- MeSH C10.551.240.250.700.500 – hypothalamic neoplasms
- MeSH C10.551.240.250.700.500.500 – pituitary neoplasms
- MeSH C10.551.240.375 – central nervous system cysts
- MeSH C10.551.240.375.500 – arachnoid cysts
- MeSH C10.551.240.500 – meningeal neoplasms
- MeSH C10.551.240.500.500 – meningioma
- MeSH C10.551.240.750 – spinal cord neoplasms
- MeSH C10.551.240.750.200 – epidural neoplasms

==== MeSH C10.551.360 – cranial nerve neoplasms ====
- MeSH C10.551.360.500 – optic nerve neoplasms
- MeSH C10.551.360.500.500 – optic nerve glioma

==== MeSH C10.551.525 – neuroma, acoustic ====
- MeSH C10.551.525.500 – neurofibromatosis 2

==== MeSH C10.551.775 – peripheral nervous system neoplasms ====
- MeSH C10.551.775.500 – nerve sheath neoplasms
- MeSH C10.551.775.500.500 – neurilemmoma
- MeSH C10.551.775.500.750 – neurofibroma
- MeSH C10.551.775.500.750.500 – neurofibroma, plexiform
- MeSH C10.551.775.500.750.750 – neurofibrosarcoma

=== MeSH C10.562 – neurocutaneous syndromes ===
==== MeSH C10.562.600 – neurofibromatosis ====
- MeSH C10.562.600.500 – neurofibromatosis 1
- MeSH C10.562.600.750 – neurofibromatosis 2

=== MeSH C10.574 – neurodegenerative diseases ===
==== MeSH C10.574.500 – heredodegenerative disorders, nervous system ====
- MeSH C10.574.500.024 – alexander disease
- MeSH C10.574.500.050 – amyloid neuropathies, familial
- MeSH C10.574.500.300 – canavan disease
- MeSH C10.574.500.362 – cockayne syndrome
- MeSH C10.574.500.393 – dystonia musculorum deformans
- MeSH C10.574.500.425 – gerstmann-straussler-scheinker disease
- MeSH C10.574.500.487 – hallervorden-spatz syndrome
- MeSH C10.574.500.492 – hepatolenticular degeneration
- MeSH C10.574.500.494 – hereditary central nervous system demyelinating diseases
- MeSH C10.574.500.495 – hereditary motor and sensory neuropathies
- MeSH C10.574.500.495.200 – charcot-marie-tooth disease
- MeSH C10.574.500.495.780 – refsum disease
- MeSH C10.574.500.495.820 – spastic paraplegia, hereditary
- MeSH C10.574.500.496 – hereditary sensory and autonomic neuropathies
- MeSH C10.574.500.496.250 – dysautonomia, familial
- MeSH C10.574.500.497 – huntington disease
- MeSH C10.574.500.529 – lafora disease
- MeSH C10.574.500.536 – lesch-nyhan syndrome
- MeSH C10.574.500.540 – menkes kinky hair syndrome
- MeSH C10.574.500.545 – myotonia congenita
- MeSH C10.574.500.547 – myotonic dystrophy
- MeSH C10.574.500.549 – neurofibromatosis
- MeSH C10.574.500.549.400 – neurofibromatosis 1
- MeSH C10.574.500.549.700 – neurofibromatosis 2
- MeSH C10.574.500.550 – neuronal ceroid-lipofuscinosis
- MeSH C10.574.500.662 – optic atrophies, hereditary
- MeSH C10.574.500.662.400 – optic atrophy, hereditary, leber
- MeSH C10.574.500.662.500 – optic atrophy, autosomal dominant
- MeSH C10.574.500.662.980 – wolfram syndrome
- MeSH C10.574.500.775 – rett syndrome
- MeSH C10.574.500.812 – spinal muscular atrophies of childhood
- MeSH C10.574.500.825 – spinocerebellar degenerations
- MeSH C10.574.500.825.200 – friedreich ataxia
- MeSH C10.574.500.825.250 – myoclonic cerebellar dyssynergia
- MeSH C10.574.500.825.650 – olivopontocerebellar atrophies
- MeSH C10.574.500.825.700 – spinocerebellar ataxias
- MeSH C10.574.500.825.700.500 – machado-joseph disease
- MeSH C10.574.500.850 – tourette syndrome
- MeSH C10.574.500.865 – tuberous sclerosis
- MeSH C10.574.500.875 – unverricht-lundborg syndrome

==== MeSH C10.574.562 – motor neuron disease ====
- MeSH C10.574.562.250 – amyotrophic lateral sclerosis
- MeSH C10.574.562.300 – bulbar palsy, progressive
- MeSH C10.574.562.500 – muscular atrophy, spinal
- MeSH C10.574.562.500.750 – spinal muscular atrophies of childhood

==== MeSH C10.574.625 – multiple system atrophy ====
- MeSH C10.574.625.600 – olivopontocerebellar atrophies
- MeSH C10.574.625.700 – shy-drager syndrome
- MeSH C10.574.625.800 – striatonigral degeneration

==== MeSH C10.574.781 – paraneoplastic syndromes, nervous system ====
- MeSH C10.574.781.500 – lambert-eaton myasthenic syndrome
- MeSH C10.574.781.550 – limbic encephalitis
- MeSH C10.574.781.625 – myelitis, transverse
- MeSH C10.574.781.700 – paraneoplastic cerebellar degeneration
- MeSH C10.574.781.850 – paraneoplastic polyneuropathy

==== MeSH C10.574.843 – prion diseases ====
- MeSH C10.574.843.300 – encephalopathy, bovine spongiform
- MeSH C10.574.843.400 – gerstmann-straussler-scheinker disease
- MeSH C10.574.843.512 – insomnia, fatal familial
- MeSH C10.574.843.625 – Kuru
- MeSH C10.574.843.850 – scrapie
- MeSH C10.574.843.925 – wasting disease, chronic

==== MeSH C10.574.945 – tauopathies ====
- MeSH C10.574.945.249 – alzheimer disease
- MeSH C10.574.945.500 – supranuclear palsy, progressive

=== MeSH C10.597 – neurologic manifestations ===
==== MeSH C10.597.350 – dyskinesias ====
- MeSH C10.597.350.090 – ataxia
- MeSH C10.597.350.090.500 – cerebellar ataxia
- MeSH C10.597.350.090.500.530 – spinocerebellar ataxias
- MeSH C10.597.350.090.500.530.060 – ataxia telangiectasia
- MeSH C10.597.350.090.500.530.530 – machado-joseph disease
- MeSH C10.597.350.090.750 – gait ataxia
- MeSH C10.597.350.110 – athetosis
- MeSH C10.597.350.200 – catalepsy
- MeSH C10.597.350.250 – chorea
- MeSH C10.597.350.300 – dystonia
- MeSH C10.597.350.300.800 – torticollis
- MeSH C10.597.350.350 – hyperkinesis
- MeSH C10.597.350.400 – hypokinesia
- MeSH C10.597.350.500 – myoclonus
- MeSH C10.597.350.600 – psychomotor agitation
- MeSH C10.597.350.675 – synkinesis
- MeSH C10.597.350.700 – tics
- MeSH C10.597.350.850 – tremor

==== MeSH C10.597.404 – gait disorders, neurologic ====
- MeSH C10.597.404.400 – gait apraxia
- MeSH C10.597.404.450 – gait ataxia

==== MeSH C10.597.606 – neurobehavioral manifestations ====
- MeSH C10.597.606.115 – catatonia
- MeSH C10.597.606.150 – communication disorders
- MeSH C10.597.606.150.500 – language disorders
- MeSH C10.597.606.150.500.050 – agraphia
- MeSH C10.597.606.150.500.090 – anomic aphasia
- MeSH C10.597.606.150.500.300 – dyslexia
- MeSH C10.597.606.150.500.300.200 – alexia (acquired dyslexia)
- MeSH C10.597.606.150.500.300.200.100 – alexia, pure
- MeSH C10.597.606.150.500.550 – language development disorders
- MeSH C10.597.606.150.500.800 – speech disorders
- MeSH C10.597.606.150.500.800.100 – aphasia
- MeSH C10.597.606.150.500.800.100.100 – expressive aphasia
- MeSH C10.597.606.150.500.800.100.111 – aphasia, conduction
- MeSH C10.597.606.150.500.800.100.155 – primary progressive aphasia
- MeSH C10.597.606.150.500.800.100.166 – receptive aphasia
- MeSH C10.597.606.150.500.800.150 – articulation disorders
- MeSH C10.597.606.150.500.800.150.200 – dysarthria
- MeSH C10.597.606.150.500.800.300 – echolalia
- MeSH C10.597.606.150.500.800.500 – mutism
- MeSH C10.597.606.150.500.800.750 – stuttering
- MeSH C10.597.606.150.550 – learning disorders
- MeSH C10.597.606.150.550.200 – dyslexia
- MeSH C10.597.606.150.550.200.500 – alexia (acquired dyslexia)
- MeSH C10.597.606.337 – confusion
- MeSH C10.597.606.337.500 – delirium
- MeSH C10.597.606.358 – consciousness disorders
- MeSH C10.597.606.358.800 – unconsciousness
- MeSH C10.597.606.358.800.200 – coma
- MeSH C10.597.606.358.800.200.100 – brain death
- MeSH C10.597.606.358.800.200.200 – coma, post-head injury
- MeSH C10.597.606.358.800.200.600 – insulin coma
- MeSH C10.597.606.358.800.400 – persistent vegetative state
- MeSH C10.597.606.358.800.600 – syncope
- MeSH C10.597.606.358.800.600.500 – syncope, vasovagal
- MeSH C10.597.606.525 – memory disorders
- MeSH C10.597.606.525.100 – amnesia
- MeSH C10.597.606.525.100.075 – amnesia, anterograde
- MeSH C10.597.606.525.100.150 – amnesia, retrograde
- MeSH C10.597.606.525.100.800 – amnesia, transient global
- MeSH C10.597.606.525.400 – korsakoff syndrome
- MeSH C10.597.606.643 – mental retardation
- MeSH C10.597.606.643.180 – cri-du-chat syndrome
- MeSH C10.597.606.643.210 – de lange syndrome
- MeSH C10.597.606.643.220 – down syndrome
- MeSH C10.597.606.643.455 – mental retardation, x-linked
- MeSH C10.597.606.643.455.124 – adrenoleukodystrophy
- MeSH C10.597.606.643.455.249 – coffin-lowry syndrome
- MeSH C10.597.606.643.455.500 – fragile x syndrome
- MeSH C10.597.606.643.455.562 – glycogen storage disease type iib
- MeSH C10.597.606.643.455.625 – lesch-nyhan syndrome
- MeSH C10.597.606.643.455.687 – menkes kinky hair syndrome
- MeSH C10.597.606.643.455.750 – mucopolysaccharidosis ii
- MeSH C10.597.606.643.455.875 – pyruvate dehydrogenase complex deficiency disease
- MeSH C10.597.606.643.455.937 – rett syndrome
- MeSH C10.597.606.643.690 – prader-willi syndrome
- MeSH C10.597.606.643.700 – rubinstein-taybi syndrome
- MeSH C10.597.606.643.969 – wagr syndrome
- MeSH C10.597.606.643.970 – williams syndrome
- MeSH C10.597.606.762 – perceptual disorders
- MeSH C10.597.606.762.100 – agnosia
- MeSH C10.597.606.762.100.300 – gerstmann syndrome
- MeSH C10.597.606.762.100.650 – prosopagnosia
- MeSH C10.597.606.762.200 – auditory perceptual disorders
- MeSH C10.597.606.762.300 – hallucinations
- MeSH C10.597.606.762.400 – illusions
- MeSH C10.597.606.762.700 – phantom limb
- MeSH C10.597.606.881 – psychomotor disorders
- MeSH C10.597.606.881.350 – apraxias
- MeSH C10.597.606.881.350.200 – apraxia, ideomotor
- MeSH C10.597.606.881.350.600 – gait apraxia
- MeSH C10.597.606.881.700 – psychomotor agitation

==== MeSH C10.597.613 – neuromuscular manifestations ====
- MeSH C10.597.613.250 – fasciculation
- MeSH C10.597.613.500 – muscle cramp
- MeSH C10.597.613.550 – muscle hypertonia
- MeSH C10.597.613.550.500 – muscle rigidity
- MeSH C10.597.613.550.550 – muscle spasticity
- MeSH C10.597.613.575 – muscle hypotonia
- MeSH C10.597.613.593 – muscle weakness
- MeSH C10.597.613.612 – muscular atrophy
- MeSH C10.597.613.650 – myokymia
- MeSH C10.597.613.700 – myotonia
- MeSH C10.597.613.750 – spasm
- MeSH C10.597.613.750.400 – hemifacial spasm
- MeSH C10.597.613.750.700 – trismus
- MeSH C10.597.613.875 – tetany

==== MeSH C10.597.617 – pain ====
- MeSH C10.597.617.152 – back pain
- MeSH C10.597.617.152.400 – low back pain
- MeSH C10.597.617.364 – facial pain
- MeSH C10.597.617.470 – headache
- MeSH C10.597.617.515 – labor pain
- MeSH C10.597.617.560 – metatarsalgia
- MeSH C10.597.617.576 – neck pain
- MeSH C10.597.617.682 – neuralgia
- MeSH C10.597.617.682.550 – neuralgia, postherpetic
- MeSH C10.597.617.682.800 – sciatica
- MeSH C10.597.617.788 – pain, intractable

==== MeSH C10.597.622 – paralysis ====
- MeSH C10.597.622.214 – facial paralysis
- MeSH C10.597.622.295 – hemiplegia
- MeSH C10.597.622.447 – ophthalmoplegia
- MeSH C10.597.622.447.511 – ophthalmoplegia, chronic progressive external
- MeSH C10.597.622.447.690 – supranuclear palsy, progressive
- MeSH C10.597.622.669 – paraplegia
- MeSH C10.597.622.669.300 – brown-sequard syndrome
- MeSH C10.597.622.714 – pseudobulbar palsy
- MeSH C10.597.622.760 – quadriplegia
- MeSH C10.597.622.812 – respiratory paralysis
- MeSH C10.597.622.943 – vocal cord paralysis

==== MeSH C10.597.636 – paresis ====
- MeSH C10.597.636.500 – paraparesis
- MeSH C10.597.636.500.500 – paraparesis, spastic

==== MeSH C10.597.690 – pupil disorders ====
- MeSH C10.597.690.150 – anisocoria
- MeSH C10.597.690.362 – miosis
- MeSH C10.597.690.362.500 – horner syndrome
- MeSH C10.597.690.575 – tonic pupil

==== MeSH C10.597.704 – reflex, abnormal ====
- MeSH C10.597.704.400 – reflex, babinski

==== MeSH C10.597.742 – seizures ====
- MeSH C10.597.742.143 – alcohol withdrawal seizures

==== MeSH C10.597.751 – sensation disorders ====
- MeSH C10.597.751.237 – dizziness
- MeSH C10.597.751.418 – hearing disorders
- MeSH C10.597.751.418.341 – hearing loss
- MeSH C10.597.751.418.341.186 – deafness
- MeSH C10.597.751.418.341.374 – hearing loss, bilateral
- MeSH C10.597.751.418.341.562 – hearing loss, conductive
- MeSH C10.597.751.418.341.750 – hearing loss, functional
- MeSH C10.597.751.418.341.812 – hearing loss, high-frequency
- MeSH C10.597.751.418.341.849 – hearing loss, mixed conductive-sensorineural
- MeSH C10.597.751.418.341.887 – hearing loss, sensorineural
- MeSH C10.597.751.418.341.887.432 – hearing loss, central
- MeSH C10.597.751.418.341.887.460 – hearing loss, noise-induced
- MeSH C10.597.751.418.341.887.772 – presbycusis
- MeSH C10.597.751.418.341.887.886 – usher syndromes
- MeSH C10.597.751.418.341.900 – hearing loss, sudden
- MeSH C10.597.751.418.341.950 – hearing loss, unilateral
- MeSH C10.597.751.418.505 – hyperacusis
- MeSH C10.597.751.418.670 – tinnitus
- MeSH C10.597.751.600 – olfaction disorders
- MeSH C10.597.751.791 – somatosensory disorders
- MeSH C10.597.751.791.400 – hyperalgesia
- MeSH C10.597.751.791.450 – hyperesthesia
- MeSH C10.597.751.791.500 – hypesthesia
- MeSH C10.597.751.791.875 – paresthesia
- MeSH C10.597.751.861 – taste disorders
- MeSH C10.597.751.861.184 – ageusia
- MeSH C10.597.751.861.479 – dysgeusia
- MeSH C10.597.751.941 – vision disorders
- MeSH C10.597.751.941.073 – amblyopia
- MeSH C10.597.751.941.162 – blindness
- MeSH C10.597.751.941.162.125 – amaurosis fugax
- MeSH C10.597.751.941.162.250 – blindness, cortical
- MeSH C10.597.751.941.256 – color vision defects
- MeSH C10.597.751.941.339 – diplopia
- MeSH C10.597.751.941.512 – hemianopsia
- MeSH C10.597.751.941.661 – photophobia
- MeSH C10.597.751.941.811 – scotoma
- MeSH C10.597.751.941.905 – vision, low

==== MeSH C10.597.975 – voice disorders ====
- MeSH C10.597.975.100 – aphonia
- MeSH C10.597.975.550 – hoarseness

=== MeSH C10.668 – neuromuscular diseases ===
==== MeSH C10.668.460 – motor neuron disease ====
- MeSH C10.668.460.250 – amyotrophic lateral sclerosis
- MeSH C10.668.460.300 – bulbar palsy, progressive
- MeSH C10.668.460.500 – muscular atrophy, spinal
- MeSH C10.668.460.500.750 – spinal muscular atrophies of childhood
- MeSH C10.668.460.600 – poliomyelitis
- MeSH C10.668.460.600.500 – postpoliomyelitis syndrome

==== MeSH C10.668.475 – muscular atrophy, spinal ====
- MeSH C10.668.475.500 – spinal muscular atrophies of childhood

==== MeSH C10.668.491 – muscular diseases ====
- MeSH C10.668.491.175 – muscular disorders, atrophic
- MeSH C10.668.491.175.500 – muscular dystrophies
- MeSH C10.668.491.175.500.074 – distal myopathies
- MeSH C10.668.491.175.500.149 – muscular dystrophies, limb-girdle
- MeSH C10.668.491.175.500.300 – muscular dystrophy, duchenne
- MeSH C10.668.491.175.500.350 – muscular dystrophy, emery-dreifuss
- MeSH C10.668.491.175.500.400 – muscular dystrophy, facioscapulohumeral
- MeSH C10.668.491.175.500.450 – muscular dystrophy, oculopharyngeal
- MeSH C10.668.491.175.500.500 – myotonic dystrophy
- MeSH C10.668.491.175.750 – postpoliomyelitis syndrome
- MeSH C10.668.491.387 – eosinophilia-myalgia syndrome
- MeSH C10.668.491.425 – fibromyalgia
- MeSH C10.668.491.500 – mitochondrial myopathies
- MeSH C10.668.491.500.500 – mitochondrial encephalomyopathies
- MeSH C10.668.491.500.500.500 – melas syndrome
- MeSH C10.668.491.500.500.550 – merrf syndrome
- MeSH C10.668.491.500.700 – ophthalmoplegia, chronic progressive external
- MeSH C10.668.491.500.700.500 – kearns-sayer syndrome
- MeSH C10.668.491.550 – myopathies, structural, congenital
- MeSH C10.668.491.550.290 – myopathies, nemaline
- MeSH C10.668.491.550.300 – myopathy, central core
- MeSH C10.668.491.562 – myositis
- MeSH C10.668.491.562.150 – dermatomyositis
- MeSH C10.668.491.562.500 – myositis, inclusion body
- MeSH C10.668.491.562.575 – polymyositis
- MeSH C10.668.491.562.575.500 – dermatomyositis
- MeSH C10.668.491.606 – myotonic disorders
- MeSH C10.668.491.606.500 – myotonia congenita
- MeSH C10.668.491.606.750 – myotonic dystrophy
- MeSH C10.668.491.650 – paralyses, familial periodic
- MeSH C10.668.491.650.450 – hypokalemic periodic paralysis
- MeSH C10.668.491.650.600 – paralysis, hyperkalemic periodic

==== MeSH C10.668.550 – muscular disorders, atrophic ====
- MeSH C10.668.550.500 – postpoliomyelitis syndrome

==== MeSH C10.668.758 – neuromuscular junction diseases ====
- MeSH C10.668.758.200 – botulism
- MeSH C10.668.758.450 – lambert-eaton myasthenic syndrome
- MeSH C10.668.758.725 – myasthenia gravis
- MeSH C10.668.758.725.300 – myasthenia gravis, autoimmune, experimental
- MeSH C10.668.758.725.650 – myasthenia gravis, neonatal
- MeSH C10.668.758.800 – myasthenic syndromes, congenital

==== MeSH C10.668.829 – peripheral nervous system diseases ====
- MeSH C10.668.829.025 – acrodynia
- MeSH C10.668.829.050 – amyloid neuropathies
- MeSH C10.668.829.050.050 – amyloid neuropathies, familial
- MeSH C10.668.829.100 – brachial plexus neuropathies
- MeSH C10.668.829.100.500 – brachial plexus neuritis
- MeSH C10.668.829.250 – complex regional pain syndromes
- MeSH C10.668.829.250.200 – causalgia
- MeSH C10.668.829.250.800 – reflex sympathetic dystrophy
- MeSH C10.668.829.300 – diabetic neuropathies
- MeSH C10.668.829.350 – guillain-barre syndrome
- MeSH C10.668.829.350.500 – miller fisher syndrome
- MeSH C10.668.829.425 – isaacs syndrome
- MeSH C10.668.829.500 – mononeuropathies
- MeSH C10.668.829.500.200 – femoral neuropathy
- MeSH C10.668.829.500.500 – median neuropathy
- MeSH C10.668.829.500.500.200 – carpal tunnel syndrome
- MeSH C10.668.829.500.600 – peroneal neuropathies
- MeSH C10.668.829.500.650 – radial neuropathy
- MeSH C10.668.829.500.675 – sciatic neuropathy
- MeSH C10.668.829.500.675.800 – sciatica
- MeSH C10.668.829.500.700 – tibial neuropathy
- MeSH C10.668.829.500.700.800 – tarsal tunnel syndrome
- MeSH C10.668.829.500.850 – ulnar neuropathies
- MeSH C10.668.829.500.850.200 – cubital tunnel syndrome
- MeSH C10.668.829.500.850.600 – ulnar nerve compression syndromes
- MeSH C10.668.829.550 – nerve compression syndromes
- MeSH C10.668.829.550.200 – carpal tunnel syndrome
- MeSH C10.668.829.550.800 – tarsal tunnel syndrome
- MeSH C10.668.829.550.850 – thoracic outlet syndrome
- MeSH C10.668.829.550.850.200 – cervical rib syndrome
- MeSH C10.668.829.550.925 – ulnar nerve compression syndromes
- MeSH C10.668.829.550.925.200 – cubital tunnel syndrome
- MeSH C10.668.829.600 – neuralgia
- MeSH C10.668.829.600.200 – causalgia
- MeSH C10.668.829.600.550 – neuralgia, postherpetic
- MeSH C10.668.829.600.800 – sciatica
- MeSH C10.668.829.650 – neuritis
- MeSH C10.668.829.650.250 – brachial plexus neuritis
- MeSH C10.668.829.650.500 – neuritis, autoimmune, experimental
- MeSH C10.668.829.675 – neurofibromatosis 1
- MeSH C10.668.829.700 – pain insensitivity, congenital
- MeSH C10.668.829.725 – peripheral nervous system neoplasms
- MeSH C10.668.829.725.500 – nerve sheath neoplasms
- MeSH C10.668.829.725.500.500 – neurilemmoma
- MeSH C10.668.829.725.500.600 – neurofibroma
- MeSH C10.668.829.725.500.600.500 – neurofibroma, plexiform
- MeSH C10.668.829.725.500.600.600 – neurofibrosarcoma
- MeSH C10.668.829.800 – polyneuropathies
- MeSH C10.668.829.800.050 – alcoholic neuropathy
- MeSH C10.668.829.800.300 – hereditary motor and sensory neuropathies
- MeSH C10.668.829.800.300.200 – charcot-marie-tooth disease
- MeSH C10.668.829.800.300.780 – refsum disease
- MeSH C10.668.829.800.300.820 – spastic paraplegia, hereditary
- MeSH C10.668.829.800.625 – hereditary sensory and autonomic neuropathies
- MeSH C10.668.829.800.625.200 – dysautonomia, familial
- MeSH C10.668.829.800.662 – paraneoplastic polyneuropathy
- MeSH C10.668.829.800.700 – poems syndrome
- MeSH C10.668.829.800.750 – polyradiculoneuropathy
- MeSH C10.668.829.800.750.300 – guillain-barre syndrome
- MeSH C10.668.829.800.750.300.500 – miller fisher syndrome
- MeSH C10.668.829.800.750.450 – hereditary sensory and autonomic neuropathies
- MeSH C10.668.829.800.750.450.250 – dysautonomia, familial
- MeSH C10.668.829.800.750.600 – polyradiculoneuropathy, chronic inflammatory demyelinating
- MeSH C10.668.829.800.750.700 – polyradiculopathy
- MeSH C10.668.829.800.750.700.700 – radiculopathy
- MeSH C10.668.829.800.875 – tangier disease

=== MeSH C10.720 – neurotoxicity syndromes ===
==== MeSH C10.720.112 – alcohol-induced disorders, nervous system ====
- MeSH C10.720.112.100 – alcohol amnestic disorder
- MeSH C10.720.112.100.500 – korsakoff syndrome
- MeSH C10.720.112.200 – alcohol withdrawal delirium
- MeSH C10.720.112.300 – alcohol withdrawal seizures
- MeSH C10.720.112.400 – alcoholic neuropathy

==== MeSH C10.720.475 – heavy metal poisoning, nervous system ====
- MeSH C10.720.475.150 – arsenic poisoning
- MeSH C10.720.475.400 – lead poisoning, nervous system
- MeSH C10.720.475.400.350 – lead poisoning, nervous system, adult
- MeSH C10.720.475.400.700 – lead poisoning, nervous system, childhood
- MeSH C10.720.475.500 – manganese poisoning
- MeSH C10.720.475.600 – mercury poisoning, nervous system
- MeSH C10.720.475.600.150 – acrodynia

=== MeSH C10.886 – sleep disorders ===
==== MeSH C10.886.425 – dyssomnias ====
- MeSH C10.886.425.175 – sleep deprivation
- MeSH C10.886.425.200 – sleep disorders, circadian rhythm
- MeSH C10.886.425.200.500 – jet lag syndrome
- MeSH C10.886.425.800 – sleep disorders, intrinsic
- MeSH C10.886.425.800.200 – disorders of excessive somnolence
- MeSH C10.886.425.800.200.400 – hypersomnolence, idiopathic
- MeSH C10.886.425.800.200.500 – kleine-levin syndrome
- MeSH C10.886.425.800.200.750 – narcolepsy
- MeSH C10.886.425.800.200.750.500 – cataplexy
- MeSH C10.886.425.800.600 – nocturnal myoclonus syndrome
- MeSH C10.886.425.800.700 – restless legs syndrome
- MeSH C10.886.425.800.750 – sleep apnea syndromes
- MeSH C10.886.425.800.750.800 – sleep apnea, central
- MeSH C10.886.425.800.750.850 – sleep apnea, obstructive
- MeSH C10.886.425.800.750.850.500 – obesity hypoventilation syndrome
- MeSH C10.886.425.800.800 – sleep initiation and maintenance disorders
- MeSH C10.886.425.800.800.400 – insomnia, fatal familial

==== MeSH C10.886.659 – parasomnias ====
- MeSH C10.886.659.618 – nocturnal myoclonus syndrome
- MeSH C10.886.659.627 – nocturnal paroxysmal dystonia
- MeSH C10.886.659.633 – rem sleep parasomnias
- MeSH C10.886.659.633.700 – rem sleep behavior disorder
- MeSH C10.886.659.633.800 – sleep paralysis
- MeSH C10.886.659.634 – restless legs syndrome
- MeSH C10.886.659.635 – sleep arousal disorders
- MeSH C10.886.659.635.600 – night terrors
- MeSH C10.886.659.635.700 – somnambulism
- MeSH C10.886.659.637 – sleep bruxism
- MeSH C10.886.659.700 – sleep-wake transition disorders

=== MeSH C10.900 – trauma, nervous system ===
==== MeSH C10.900.250 – cerebrovascular trauma ====
- MeSH C10.900.250.300 – carotid artery injuries
- MeSH C10.900.250.300.300 – carotid artery, internal, dissection
- MeSH C10.900.250.300.400 – carotid-cavernous sinus fistula
- MeSH C10.900.250.650 – vertebral artery dissection

==== MeSH C10.900.300 – craniocerebral trauma ====
- MeSH C10.900.300.087 – brain injuries
- MeSH C10.900.300.087.125 – brain concussion
- MeSH C10.900.300.087.125.500 – post-concussion syndrome
- MeSH C10.900.300.087.187 – brain hemorrhage, traumatic
- MeSH C10.900.300.087.187.200 – brain stem hemorrhage, traumatic
- MeSH C10.900.300.087.187.300 – cerebral hemorrhage, traumatic
- MeSH C10.900.300.087.250 – brain injury, chronic
- MeSH C10.900.300.087.500 – diffuse axonal injury
- MeSH C10.900.300.087.600 – epilepsy, post-traumatic
- MeSH C10.900.300.087.700 – pneumocephalus
- MeSH C10.900.300.087.850 – shaken baby syndrome
- MeSH C10.900.300.131 – cerebrospinal fluid otorrhea
- MeSH C10.900.300.153 – cerebrospinal fluid rhinorrhea
- MeSH C10.900.300.175 – coma, post-head injury
- MeSH C10.900.300.218 – cranial nerve injuries
- MeSH C10.900.300.218.150 – abducens nerve injury
- MeSH C10.900.300.218.300 – facial nerve injuries
- MeSH C10.900.300.218.550 – optic nerve injuries
- MeSH C10.900.300.350 – head injuries, closed
- MeSH C10.900.300.350.300 – brain concussion
- MeSH C10.900.300.350.300.500 – post-concussion syndrome
- MeSH C10.900.300.675 – head injuries, penetrating
- MeSH C10.900.300.837 – intracranial hemorrhage, traumatic
- MeSH C10.900.300.837.150 – brain hemorrhage, traumatic
- MeSH C10.900.300.837.150.300 – brain stem hemorrhage, traumatic
- MeSH C10.900.300.837.150.650 – cerebral hemorrhage, traumatic
- MeSH C10.900.300.837.300 – hematoma, epidural, cranial
- MeSH C10.900.300.837.600 – hematoma, subdural
- MeSH C10.900.300.837.600.050 – hematoma, subdural, acute
- MeSH C10.900.300.837.600.120 – hematoma, subdural, chronic
- MeSH C10.900.300.837.600.400 – hematoma, subdural, intracranial
- MeSH C10.900.300.837.800 – subarachnoid hemorrhage, traumatic
- MeSH C10.900.300.918 – skull fractures
- MeSH C10.900.300.918.150 – skull fracture, basilar
- MeSH C10.900.300.918.300 – skull fracture, depressed

==== MeSH C10.900.850 – spinal cord injuries ====
- MeSH C10.900.850.250 – autonomic dysreflexia
- MeSH C10.900.850.625 – central cord syndrome

The list continues at List of MeSH codes (C11).
