= Suicide by firearm =

Suicide method

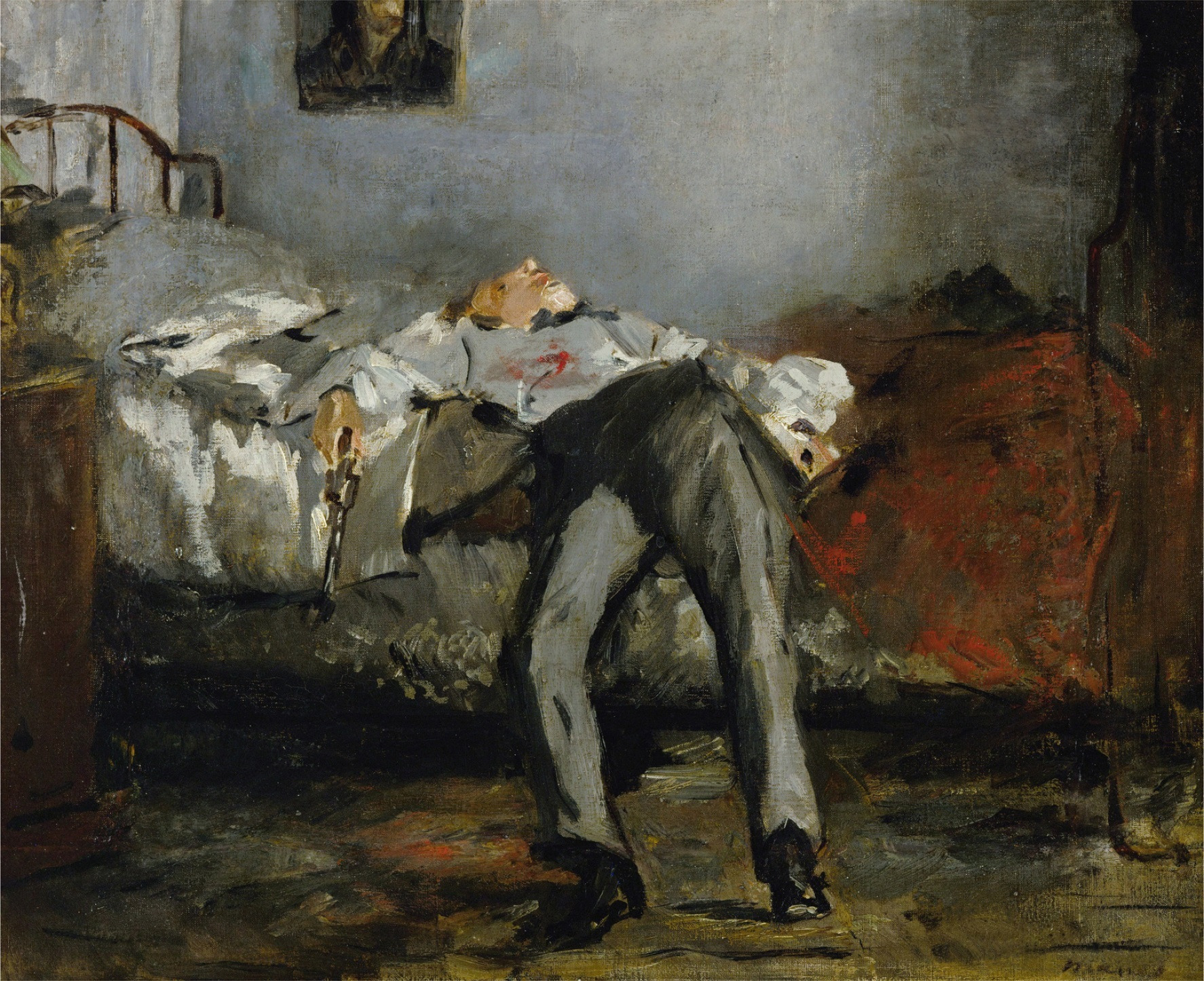
Le Suicidé by Édouard Manet (ca. 1877)

In the United States, suicide by firearm is the most lethal method of suicide, resulting in a fatality 90% of the time, and is the leading cause of death by suicide in the United States as of 2017. Worldwide, firearm prevalence in suicides varies widely, depending on the acceptance and availability of firearms in a culture. The use of firearms in suicides ranges from less than 10% in Australia, to 50.5% in the U.S., where it is the most common method of suicide.

Generally, the bullet or shotgun slug will be fired at point-blank range. Surviving a self-inflicted gunshot may result in severe chronic pain as well as reduced cognitive abilities and motor function, subdural hematoma, foreign bodies in the head, pneumocephalus and cerebrospinal fluid leaks. For temporal bone directed bullets, temporal lobe abscess, meningitis, aphasia, hemianopsia, and hemiplegia are common late intracranial complications. As many as 50% of people who survive gunshot wounds directed at the temporal bone suffer facial nerve damage, usually due to a severed nerve.

== Gun control ==
Though substance overdose is the most common method of attempted suicide in the U.S., guns are the most lethal (most likely to result in death).

For both men and women, gun suicide death rates are positively correlated with household gun ownership rates.

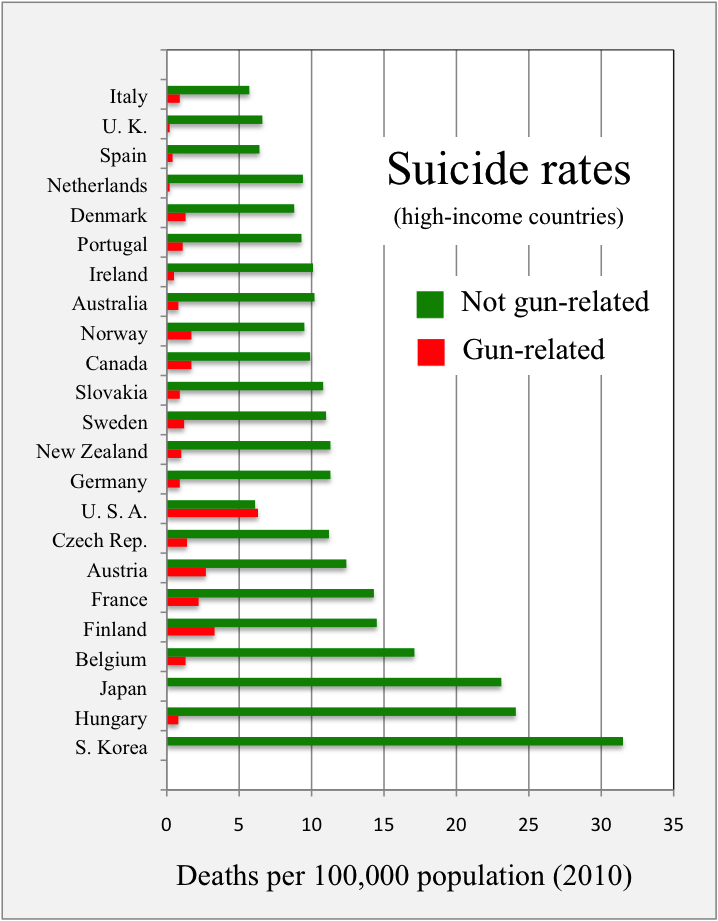
Comparison of gun-related suicide rates to non-gun-related suicide rates in high-income OECD countries, 2010, countries in graph ordered by total suicides. The US was the only OECD country in which gun suicide rates exceeded non-gun suicide rates.

Suicide rate by firearm

Reducing access to guns and ammunition at a population level decreases the risk of suicide by firearms. Fewer people die from suicide overall in places with stricter laws regulating the use, purchase, and trading of firearms. Suicide risk goes up when firearms are more available.

Gun control is a primary method of reducing suicide by people who live in a home with guns. Prevention measures include simple actions such as storing ammunition locked up and away from firearms, locking all firearms in a gun safe or installing gun locks. Some people self-impose a barrier to using the keys to unlock their guns, such as by asking a friend to keep the keys in a different place, or by freezing them in an ice cube. This prevents spur-of-the-moment access to their own guns. Some stores that sell guns provide temporary storage as a service; in other cases, a trusted friend or family member will offer to store the guns until the crisis has passed. When a person is going through a crisis, red flag laws in some places allow family members to petition the courts to have firearms temporarily removed and stored elsewhere.

More firearms are involved in suicide than are involved in homicides in the United States. A 1999 study of California and gun mortality found that a person is more likely to die by suicide if they have purchased a firearm, with a measurable increase of suicide by firearm beginning at most a week after the purchase and continuing for six years or more.

Among developed countries, the United States has the highest number of firearms in circulation and one of the highest suicide rates, and when gun ownership rises so too does suicide involving the use of a firearm. A 2004 report by the National Academy of Sciences found an association between estimated household firearm ownership and gun suicide rates, though a study by two Harvard researchers did not find a statistically significant association between household firearms and gun suicide rates, except in the suicides of children aged 5–14. Another study found that gun prevalence rates were positively associated with suicide rates among people aged 15 to 24, and 65 to 84, but not among those aged 25 to 64. Access to firearms is associated with a higher risk of suicide, especially for people keeping loaded guns in the home. Numerous ecological and time series studies have also shown a positive association between gun ownership rates and suicide rates. This association tends to only exist for firearm-related and overall suicides, not for non-firearm suicides. Studies consistently find a relationship between gun ownership and gun-related suicides, with few exceptions. A 2016 study found a positive association between gun ownership and both gun-related and overall suicides among men, but not among women; gun ownership was only strongly associated with gun-related suicides among women. Overall, six times more men committed suicide by firearm between 1990 and 2019.

During the 1980s and early 1990s, there was a strong upward trend in adolescent suicides with a gun, as well as a sharp overall increase in suicides among those age 75 and over. According to a Serbian study, in the years between 1990 and 2019, the global raw numbers for suicide by firearm remained roughly stable, indicating a decline in per capita rate of about 2% per year.

Firearm-related suicides declined in Australia after the introduction of nationwide gun control. The same study found no evidence of substitution to other methods. In Canada, gun suicides declined after gun control, but other methods rose, leading to no change in the overall rates. Similarly, in New Zealand, gun suicides declined after more legislation, but overall suicide rates did not change; this might be due to the highly stringent firearm storage laws and very low prevalence of handgun ownership in New Zealand. A study about Canada found no significant correlations between provincial firearm ownership and overall provincial suicide rates.

== Multiple gunshot suicide ==
Multiple-gunshot suicide occurs when an individual commits suicide by inflicting multiple gunshots on themself before becoming incapacitated. It excludes suicides where the firearms are operated by other people, such as suicide by cop.
