= Sinusoidal hemangioma =

Sinusoidal hemangioma is a condition, by something of a misnomer, a term for a lesion that is a vascular malformation with various clinical presentations. This condition may present as nodules, often in the breast area or extremities, or as large firm bulging facial masses beneath normal-appearing skin; the latter have an aggressive and invasive course.

== See also ==
- Sinus pericranii
- List of cutaneous conditions
