= Central nervous system cyst =

- Other names: Brain cyst
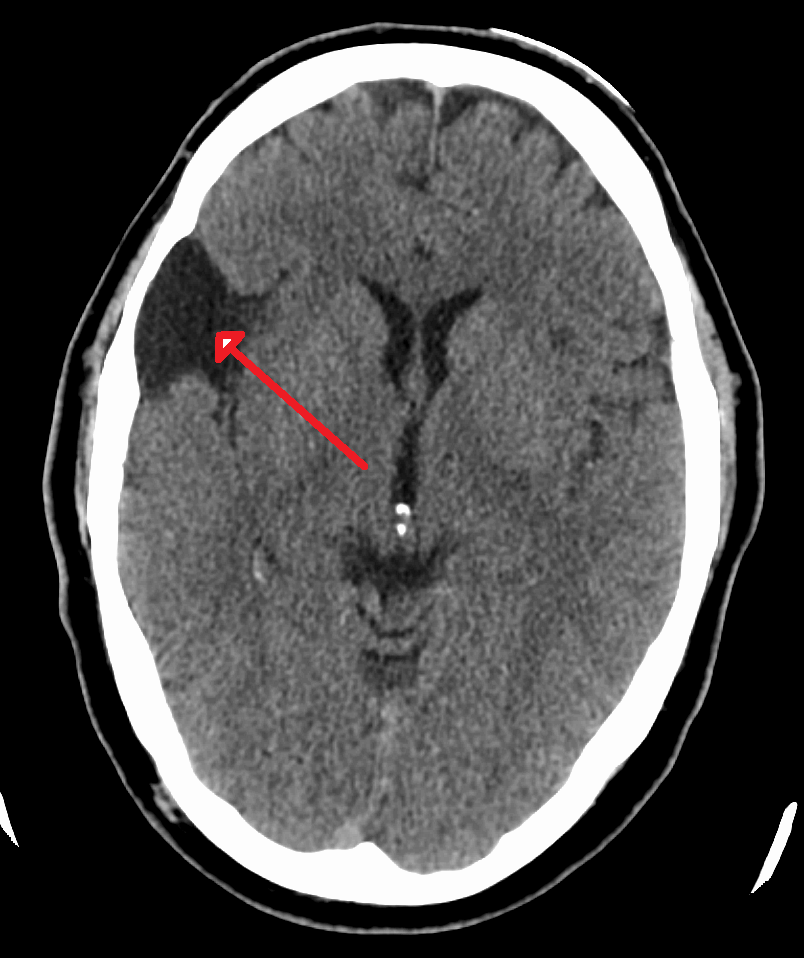
- A CT scan of an arachnoid cyst
- Specialty: Medical genetics

A central nervous system cyst is a type of cyst that presents and affects part of the central nervous system (CNS). They are usually benign and filled with either cerebrospinal fluid, blood, or tumor cells. CNS cysts are classified into two categories: cysts that originate from non-central nervous system tissue, migrate to, and form on a portion of the CNS, and cysts that originate within central nervous system tissue itself. Within these two categories, there are many types of CNS cysts that have been identified from previous studies.

== Classification ==
=== Originating from non-central nervous system tissue ===
These classification of cysts are embedded in the endoderm (inner layer) and the ectoderm (outer layer) of the cranial or spinal cord germ layers. They normally take over the neuraxis, the axis of the central nervous system that determines how the nervous system is placed, which allows the cysts to infiltrate the CNS tissues. They are most commonly found in the area near the pineal gland, the chiasmatic cistern, and the cerebellopontine angle space. These common places generally house extensive and continuously growing cysts. Some examples of cysts originating from non-central nervous system tissue include:

- Teratomas cysts (containing multiple body tissue types)
- Dermoid (epidermoid/epidermoid tumor)
- Rathke's cleft cysts
- Pineal cysts
- Tumor-associated cysts
- Epithelial cysts that originate from upper respiratory and intestinal tracks.

=== Originating from the central nervous system tissue ===
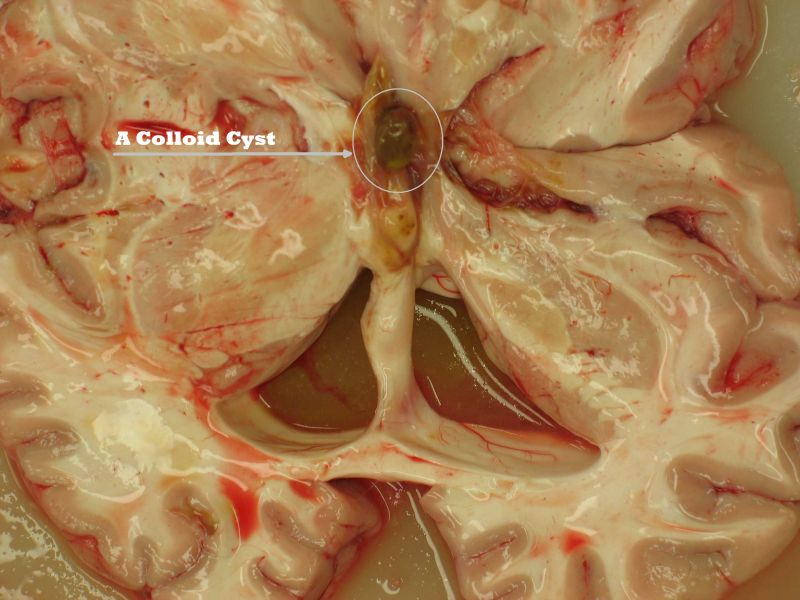
Human brain showing a colloid cyst in the third ventricle

This category of cysts takes over areas of necrotic tissue in the brain from injuries, diseases, or abnormalities, which occur due to the central nervous system's nonregenerative nature. These cysts can affect all germ layers of the CNS, but are most common in the arachnoid mater, and the ventricular space, which may block CSF pathways. These cysts can be static (stationary) or progressive. Some examples of cysts originating from the CNS tissue include:

- Arachnoid cysts (Leptomeningeal cysts)
- Ependymal cysts
- Cystic cerebellar astrocytomas
- Colloid cysts

== Signs and symptoms ==
Symptoms are assessed on a case-by-case basis. Some cysts in the CNS can be asymptomatic (producing or showing no symptoms), depending on their location in the brain or spinal cord. If the cysts develop in critical areas of the central nervous system, they can present one or more of the following symptoms:

- Pressure in the spinal cord or brain
- Rupture of nerves around the cyst
- Weakness in specific parts of the body controlled by the cyst-infected brain region
- Inflammation
- Hydrocephalus
- Brainstem hemorrhage
- Seizures
- Visual disturbances and hearing loss
- Headache
- Difficulty with balance or walking

In general, symptoms vary depending on the type of cyst and its location within the CNS.

== Causes ==
Many CNS cysts form in the womb during the first few weeks of development as a result of congenital defects. In adults cysts may also form due to a head injury or trauma, resulting in necrotic tissues (dead tissue), and can sometimes be associated with cancerous tumors or infection in the brain. However, the underlying reasons for cyst formation are still unknown.

== Diagnosis ==
CT scan of a colloid cyst

The diagnostic process typically begins with a medical history workup followed by a medical examination by a physician. Imaging tests, such as CT scans and MRIs, help provide a clearer picture. The physician typically looks for fluid (or other bodily substance) filled sacs to appear in the scans, as is shown in the CT scan of a colloid cyst. A primary health care provider will refer an individual to a neurologist or neurosurgeon for further examination. Other diagnostic methods include radiological examinations and macroscopic examinations. After a diagnosis has been made, immunohistochemistry may be used to differentiate between epithelial cysts and arachnoid cysts. These examinations are useful to get a general idea of possible treatment options, but can be unsatisfactory to diagnose CNS cysts. Professionals still do not fully understand how cysts form; however, analyzing the walls of different cyst types, using electron microscopes and light microscopes, has proven to be the best diagnostic tool. This has led to more accurate cyst classification and correct course of action for treatments that are cyst specific. In the past, before imaging scans or tests were available, medical professionals could only diagnose cysts via exploratory surgery.

== Treatment ==
Treatment is often largely dependent on the type of cyst. Asymptomatic cysts, termed pseudocysts, normally require active monitoring with periodic scans for future growth. Symptomatic (producing or showing symptoms) cysts may require surgical removal if they are present in areas where brain damage is unavoidable, or if they produce chronic symptoms disruptive to the quality of life of the patient. Some examples of cyst removal procedures include: permanent drainage, fenestration, and endoscopic cyst fenestration.

=== Permanent drainage ===
A neurosurgeon may open a portion of the body and insert a shunt into cerebral spinal fluid (CSF) filled cysts to allow drainage into CSF pathways. The fluid from the cyst is then drained into the abdomen, the body reabsorbs the fluid (reabsorption of fluid does not cause any harm). This type of surgical treatment is often performed to relieve pressure on the brain from a cyst within the cerebral cortex.

=== Fenestration ===
A neurosurgeon performs a craniotomy as a means of entry to access the cyst. The cyst is then opened to release its contents, which are reabsorbed by the brain. This is commonly used with inflammatory cysts located in the ventricles, and can result in increased ventricular fluid flow within the brain.

=== Endoscopic cyst fenestration ===
A neurosurgeon performs a same day surgery to insert an endoscope, which drains the cyst internally.

== Epidemiology ==
Cysts derived from CNS tissues are very common in America. They are a subtype of cerebrovascular diseases, which are the third leading cause of death in America. Generally, CNS cysts are present in all geographic regions, races, ages, and sexes. However, certain types of CNS cysts are more prevalent in certain types of individuals than others. Some examples of incidence rates in specific types of cysts include:

- Arachnoid cysts are more prevalent in males than females
- Colloid cysts are more prevalent in adults
- Dermoid cysts are more prevalent in children under 10 years of age
- Epidermoid cysts are more prevalent in middle-aged adults
