= Polyradiculoneuropathy =

- Specialty: Neurology

Polyradiculoneuropathy describes a condition in which polyneuropathy and polyradiculopathy occur together. An example is Guillain–Barré syndrome.

== History ==
Neuropathy was described in 1890 by Hermann Eichworst, a German neurologist in Switzerland. In 1914 Hoestermann described a middle aged man who experienced 6 relapses of polyneuropathy in a 30 year span and published early clinical descriptions of recurrent neuropathic conditions.

AIDP was first described in 1916 by Guillain, Barré, and Strohl, who named the disease Guillain Barre syndrome.

== Demographics ==
=== CIDP ===
Men are twice as likely to develop CIDP, primarily in people aged 50–60. Prevalence ranges from 0.8-8.9 per 100,000 people

=== AIDP ===
AIDP affects both sexes equally, seen in a wide range of ages but likelihood increases with age. Prevalence ranges from 0.6-2.7 per 100,000 people

== Distinguishing acute vs chronic ==
Distinguishing between CIDP and AIDP depending on progression timeline and relapse. For a chronic diagnosis patients must have symptoms for 8 weeks, have an unclear cause, and progressive symptom onset. For an acute diagnosis patients symptoms cease before 8 weeks, are preceded by infection, and have rapid symptom onset. AIDP is preceded by illness including, these include Epstein Barr virus, Influenza, Hepatitis, HIV, and Coronavirus.

Some symptoms can differentiate the two diseases. Posterior column sensory symptoms like ataxia and proprioceptive loss indicate CIDP whereas autonomic involvement like facial weakness and a preceding infection indicate AIDP .

== Symptoms ==
Symptoms can be symmetrical or asymmetrical in distribution, and have distal and or proximal spread.

Symptoms include tingling in the arms and legs, weakening of limbs, loss of reflexes, loss of balance an ability to walk, and eventual loss of feeling in arms and legs

== Classifications of CIDP and subtypes ==
Classifications include: progressive where the disease worsens over time, recurrent where episodes of symptoms come and go, or monophasic where there is a single occurrence for 1–3 years and it doesn’t return. CIDP includes many subtypes: distal predominant, typical, sensory predominant, asymmetric, motor predominant. Subtypes may have different immune pathologies.

=== Typical ===
Typical has symmetrical polyneuropathy affecting proximal and distal muscle equally. Typical accounts for roughly 50% of cases symptoms begin with paresthesia and limb weakness and progress.

=== Sensory predominant ===
Sensory predominant, accounts for 5-35% of patients. Symptoms start with lower limb numbness, patients may develop motor weakness. In these cases, sensory symptoms are more predominant than motor symptoms which can develop later on. These include impairment of vibration and joint position sense and gait ataxia with preserved muscle strength.

=== Distal ===
Distal acquired demyelinating symmetric neuropathy, has an unknown occurrence %. It has predominantly sensory symptoms with distal and symmetric distribution.

=== Motor dominant ===
Motor dominant, accounts for 7-10% of patients. Often with relapse remitting weakness. These patients reserved sensation with motor symptoms predominantly.

=== Multifocal ===
Multifocal acquired demyelinating sensory and motor neuropathy, accounts for 6-15% of patients. It presents as asymmetric multifocal multiple mononeuropathy in upper limbs. It is known as Lewis Sumner Syndrome. It predominantly affects upper limbs first and eventually spreads to lower limbs. More often affects cranial nerves, with asymmetric progressive weakness with muscle atrophy.

=== Focal ===
Focal, accounts for 1% of cases. Symptoms restricted to one focal region for prolonged period of time and are often affecting brachial or lumbosacral plexus.

== Mechanism ==
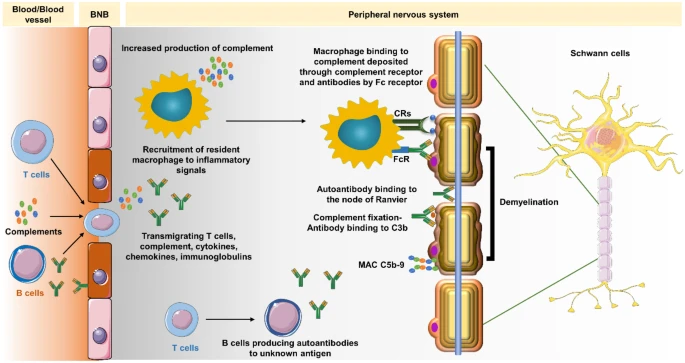
Mechanism of CIDP

Involves an immunologic antibody mediated reaction where the endoneurium is infiltrated by T-calls and macrophages at the perivascular and endoneurial levels. These cells act as antigen presenting cells and promote demyelination. Endoneurial macrophages act as antigen presenting cells. Hematogenous macrophages cross the blood nerve barrier and enter the nerve attracted by chemokines. Within the nerve, macrophages release pro-inflammatory cytokines (IL-1, TNF-a). Macrophages help recovery by promoting T-cell apoptosis and secreting anti-inflammatory cytokines (IL-10, TGF-b).

Complements interact with antigen presenting cells, directing cytokine release, and regulating the contraction phase of T cell response. T-cells and macrophages contribute to demyelination by triggering inflammation. T-cells release cytokines activating macrophages. Both cells directly damage myelin and Schwann cells leading to destruction of myelin sheath and subsequently affecting axons.

== Current research ==
=== Animal models ===
Animal model: chronic EAN (c-EAN) model in Lewis rats. Induced by active immunization of Lewis rats with P0(180-199) peptide thio-palmitoylated at cysteine 1. Clinical scores indicated CIDP symptoms.

== Diagnostic tools ==
Diagnosis includes blood and urine samples, nerve conduction study which uses electrical currents to test nerve response, lumbar puncture to test cerebral spinal fluid, nerve biopsy, and MRI to look for inflammation of nerve roots.

== Treatment ==
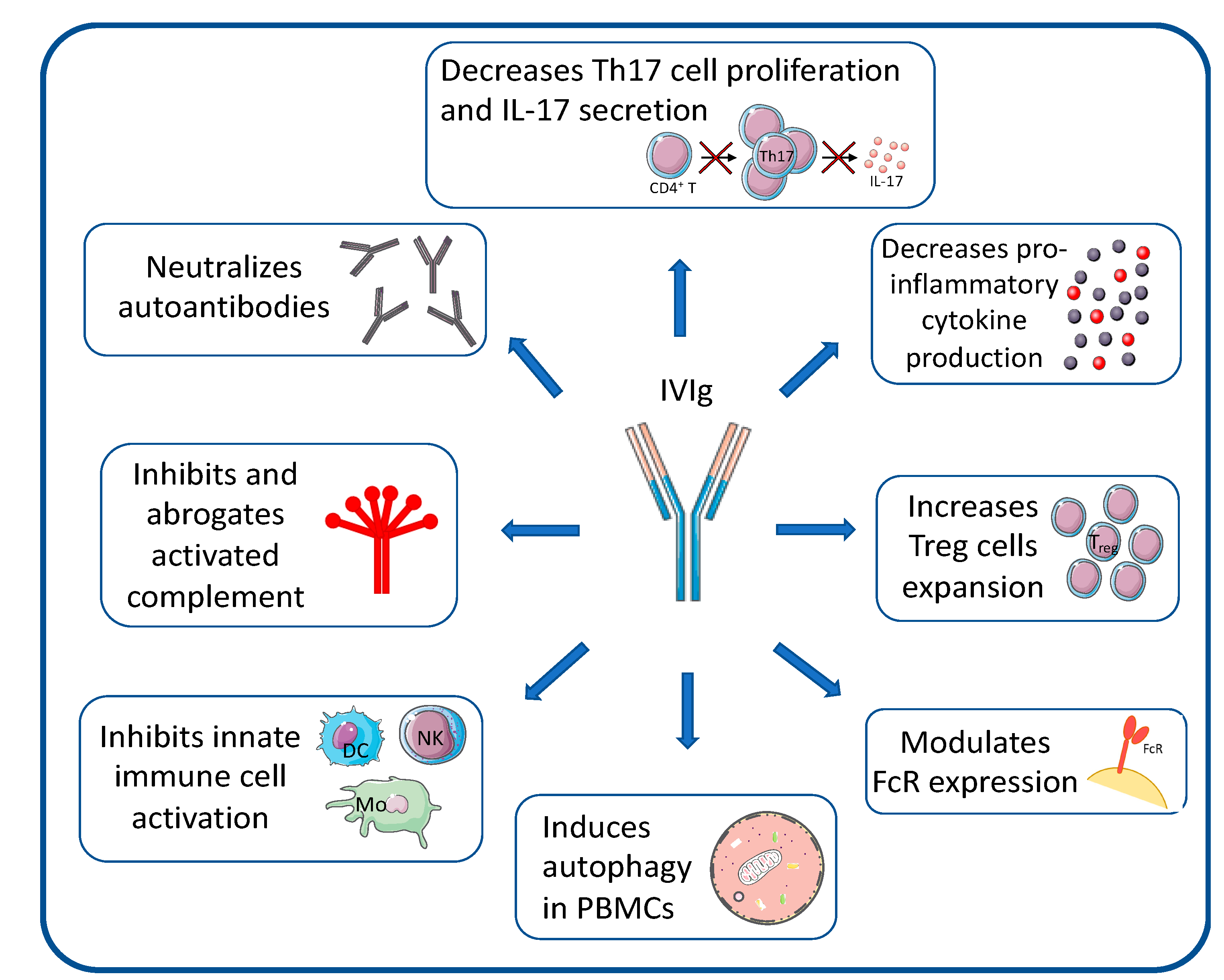
Treatment methods for CIDP

Treatments include immunosuppressive medicines, steroids, intravenous immunoglobin, plasma exchange, and monoclonal antibody therapy, and also physical and occupational therapy.

Treatment with a single course of intravenous immunoglobulin (IVIG) infusions has been demonstrated to be a potentially effective treatment (reported to have caused prolonged remission in a case associated with systemic lupus (Systemic lupus erythematosus)).

== Prognosis ==
Without treatment, 1 in 3 people with CIDP will need a wheelchair. Treatment will limit symptoms for better quality of life but there is no cure.
