= Subdural effusion =

- Specialty: Neurology

Subdural effusion refers to an effusion in the subdural space, usually of cerebrospinal fluid.

It is sometimes treated with surgery.

== See also ==
- Cerebrospinal fluid leak
