= Vascular headache =

- Specialty: Neurology

A vascular headache is an outdated term to describe certain types of headache which were thought to be related to blood vessel swelling and hyperemia as cause of pain.

Some headaches are caused by vascular effects. However, vascular headache is no longer a recognized term and is not mentioned in the Headache classification of the International Headache Society (IHS), although it is still used by some physicians and is still mentioned in some medical classification systems. There are many types of vascular headaches. Other types of vascular headaches include headaches produced by fever, cluster headaches, and headaches from a rise in blood pressure (OSU Wexner Medical Center, 2012). Headaches that were described as being vascular headaches include:

- Cluster headache
- Migraine
- Toxic headache
