= Choroid plexus papilloma =

- Other names: Papilloma of the choroid plexus
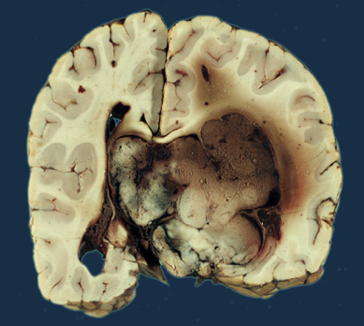
- Specialty: Neuro-oncology, Neurosurgery

Choroid plexus papilloma, also known as papilloma of the choroid plexus, is a rare benign neuroepithelial intraventricular WHO grade I lesion found in the choroid plexus. It leads to increased cerebrospinal fluid production, thus causing increased intracranial pressure and hydrocephalus.

Choroid plexus papilloma occurs in the lateral ventricles of children and in the fourth ventricle of adults. This is unlike most other pediatric tumors and adult tumors, in which the locations of the tumors is reversed. In children, brain tumors are usually found in the infratentorial region and in adults, brain tumors are usually found in the supratentorial space. The relationship is reversed for choroid plexus papillomas.

== Epidemiology ==
CPPs are rare tumors of neuroectodermal origin. They make up 0.4 to 0.6 percent of all intracranial neoplasms in children and are the third most prevalent congenital brain tumors after teratomas and gliomas. With a median age upon diagnosis of 3.5 years, this lesion is often a disease of infancy. They often reside supratentorial in the lateral ventricles of infants (most commonly in the atrium). The fourth ventricle in adults is the optimum location. Adults rarely have it at the cerebellopontine angle.

== Etiology ==
Simian virus (SV) 40 has been linked in studies to the development of choroid plexus tumors (CPTs). The BK and JC viruses have also been linked to the problem. In people with choroid plexus tumors, complexes formed by the big T antigen and the tumor suppressor proteins p53 and pRb have been shown to develop. However, the available evidence do not suggest a causal involvement. There is currently no additional causal component being investigated. One of the most prevalent mutations in CPTs is the TP53 R248W mutation.

== Signs and symptoms ==
Signs of the tumor resulting from increased intracranial pressure are present in 91% of patients, with vomiting, homonymous visual field defects and headache being the most common symptoms. Other symptoms are ear ringing and nausea, loss of balance and mobility, worsening eyesight, memory issues, brain fog, and mood swings.

== Pathophysiology ==
Choroid plexus tumors are divided into three categories by the World Health Organization (2016): papillomas (grade I), atypical tumors (grade II), and carcinomas (grade III). Less than two mitotic figures per 10 high power fields are present in CPPs, two to five are present in atypical ones, and more than five are present in carcinomas. The tumors are visible as pink, soft, spherical lumps with erratic projections and considerable vascularity.

== Histopathology ==
The tumor is neuroectodermal in origin and similar in structure to a normal choroid plexus. They may be created by epithelial cells of the choroid plexus. Papillary fronds lined by bland columnar epithelium are visible under the microscope. Normal absences include mitotic activity, nuclear pleomorphism, and necrosis. Tumors have positive immunohistochemistry for cytokeratin, vimentin, podoplanin, and S-100. Up to 20% of choroid plexus papilloma patients may test positive for glial fibrillary acidic protein (GFAP). Studies have found that fourth ventricle cancers express more S100 than lateral ventricle tumors, and older patients (over 20 years) express more GFAP and transthyretin than younger patients. Some individuals with choroid plexus papilloma have germline TP53 gene mutations, according to genetic analyses. These cancers rarely exhibit nuclear p53 protein positivity. Aicardi syndrome, hypomelanosis of Ito, and 9p duplication are syndromic correlations of choroid plexus papilloma.

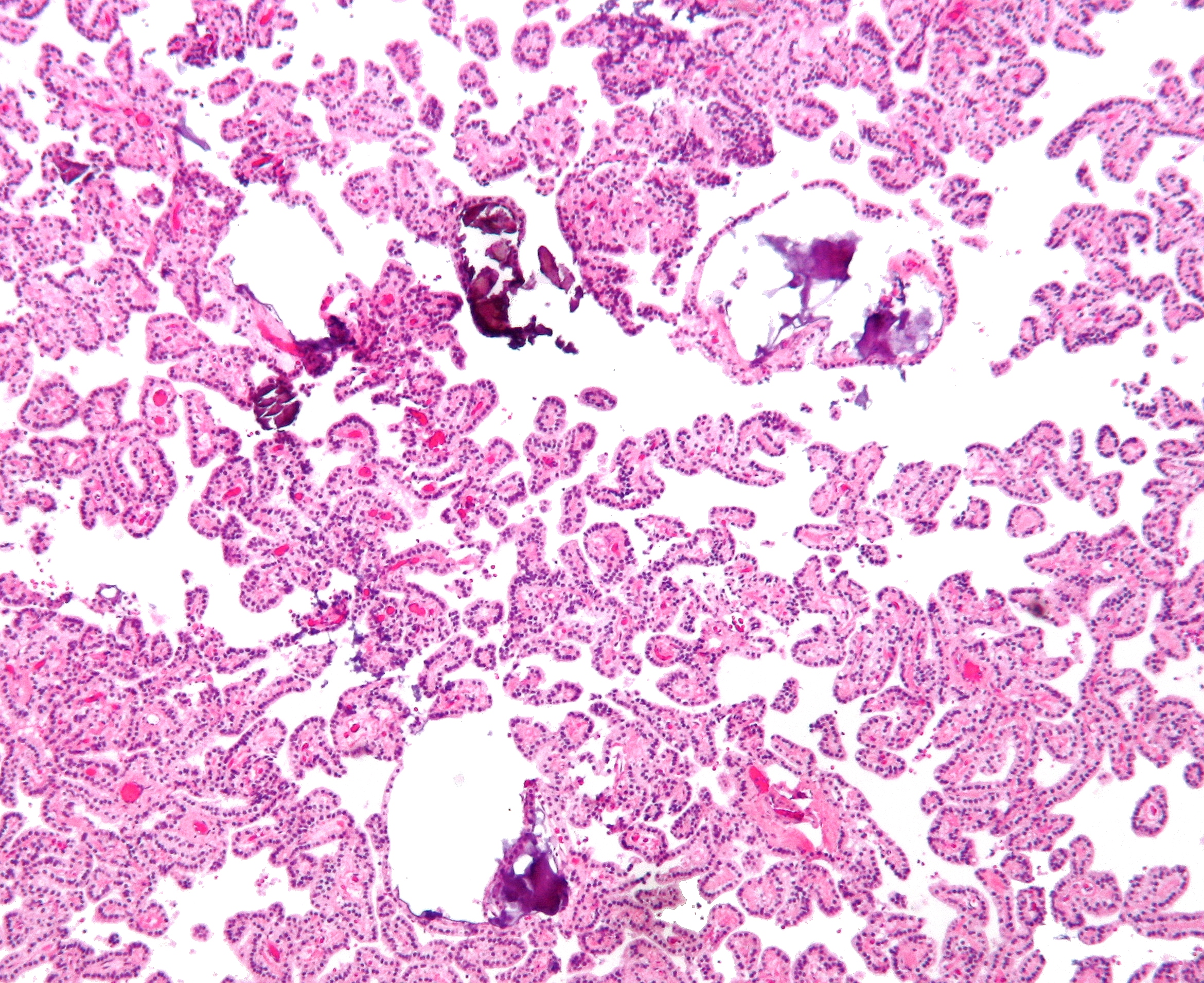
Micrograph of a choroid plexus papilloma. H&E stain.

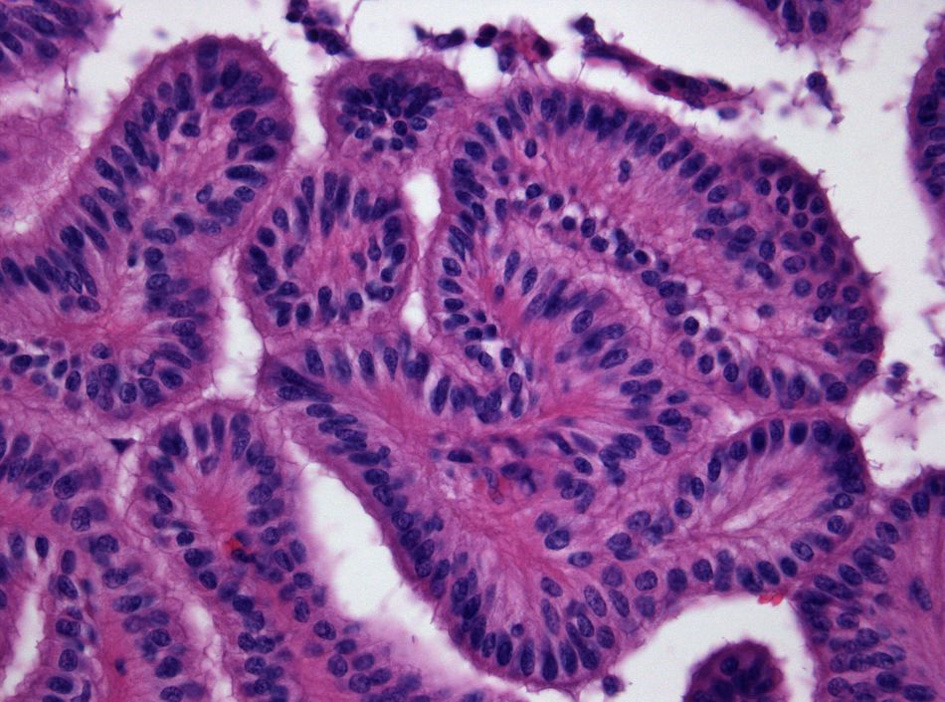
Plexuspapillom Detail

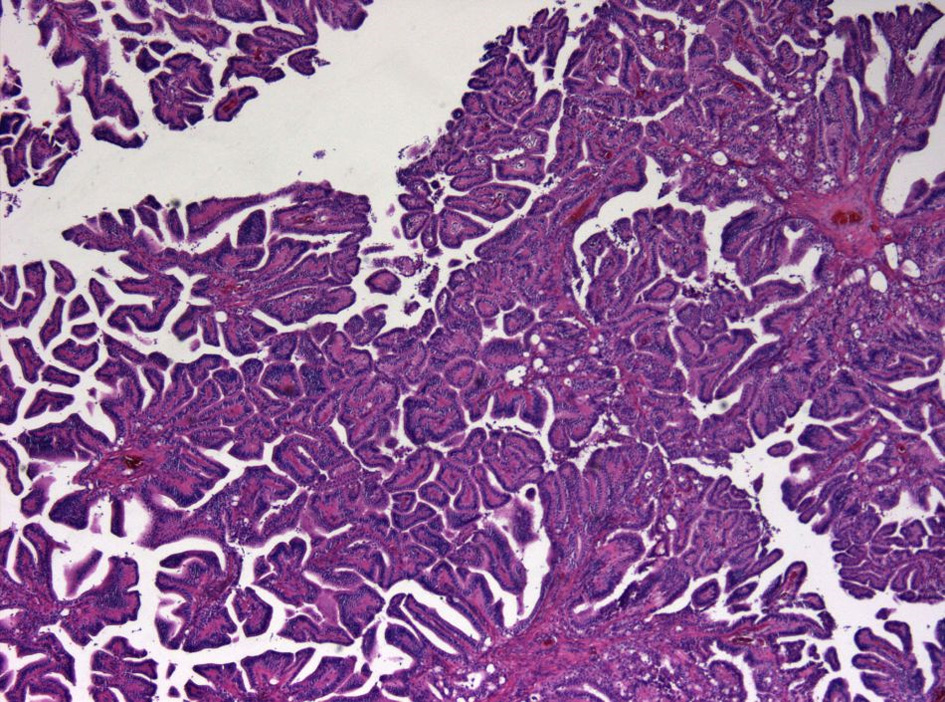
Plexuspapillom Overview

== Diagnosis ==
A neurosonogram via the anterior fontanelle will show an echogenic lesion inside the ventricles if the fontanelles are not united. This lesion exhibits bidirectional flow throughout the diastole, demonstrating blood flow via disorganized vascular arrangement. Sometimes ultrasound scans are used to diagnose the lesions before birth. An isodense or slightly hyperdense lesion inside the ventricles, as well as the resulting ventriculomegaly, are visible on computer tomography (CT). The intraventricular lobulated masses are well-defined and resemble fronds; they are hypointense on T1WI and hyperintense on T2WI on magnetic resonance imaging (MRI). Active blood flow is indicated by the presence of flow voids. A rich vascularity gives the lesions a brilliant enhancing quality. Recent researches have shown that choroid plexus papilloma and choroid plexus cancer may be distinguished from one another using arterial spin labeling.

== Treatment ==
There is disagreement about the best time to do surgery on tumors that were discovered accidentally. An option may be an immediate surgical removal, or surgery might be postponed until follow-up imaging reveals radiographic abnormalities or hydrocephalus, or surgery might be a possibility if the patient starts to experience symptoms. Once hydrocephalus occurs, it is simpler to remove the tumor since there is more room around it and the path to the ventricles is shorter. Such a policy has the drawback that patients may experience focused deficiencies as a result of seizures, subarachnoid hemorrhage, or mass impact. In addition, patients often experience cognitive problems as tumor progress. In symptomatic patients, since these tumors are benign, gross total resection (GTR) is the preferred course of therapy. Because of recent improvements in imaging, surgical techniques, and intensive care quality, the chance of a cure has reached nearly 100% . Significant (12 percent) perioperative mortality occurs in the juvenile population, with catastrophic blood loss accounting for the majority of cases. Preoperative embolization can improve the likelihood of a full tumor resection and reduce this risk. Radiosurgery could be a therapy option. To decrease blood flow and increase tumor resectability, percutaneous stereotactic intratumoral embolization with a sclerosing agent has also been tried. Although it is rarely used, adjuvant chemotherapy can prolong survival and prevent recurrence. Irradiation followed by subtotal resection may be used to treat a developing residual choroid plexus papilloma, making it more likely to success. Malignant tumors and those with leptomeningeal dissemination require adjuvant treatment as well. Bevacizumab is playing a bigger part in disseminated choroid plexus papilloma, according to recent research.

== Differential Diagnosis ==
Choroid plexus papilloma differentials include the following: Meningioma, Chordoid glioma, Rosette-forming glioneuronal tumor, Central nervous system lymphoma Metastasis, Central neurocytoma, Intraventricular tumors such as papillary ependymoma, Subependymoma, Subependymal giant cell tumor, Choroid plexus tumors, Medulloblastoma.

== Prognosis ==
The prognosis of patients has been significantly enhanced by advances in surgical and critical care treatments. Maximum tumor removal is associated with improved progression-free and overall survival. Recurrences are uncommon. Although uncommon, reports of suprasellar metastases and craniospinal seeding have been made.

== Complications ==
Children who have had their intracranial pressure elevated for a long time may come with symptoms such papilledema, optic atrophy, and vision loss that may not improve after surgery. Some may experience postoperative convulsions, bleeding, and cognitive impairments. Additionally, reports of postoperative CSF rhinorrhea have been reported.
