= Lewy body disease =

Lewy body disease may refer to:

- Lewy body dementia, umbrella term for two subtypes of dementia
- Dementia with Lewy bodies, type of dementia
- Parkinson's disease, neurodegerative disease
