= Carotid-cavernous fistula =

- Other names: CCF
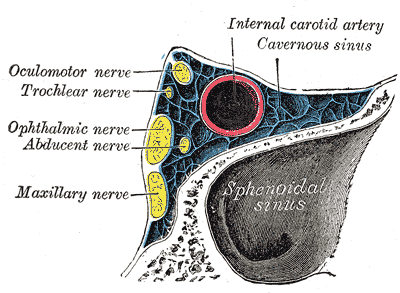
- Oblique section through the cavernous sinus.
- Specialty: Neurology, cardiology

A carotid-cavernous fistula results from an abnormal communication between the arterial and venous systems within the cavernous sinus in the skull. It is a type of arteriovenous fistula. As arterial blood under high pressure enters the cavernous sinus, the normal venous return to the cavernous sinus is impeded and this causes engorgement of the draining veins, manifesting most dramatically as a sudden engorgement and redness of the eye of the same side.

== Presentation ==
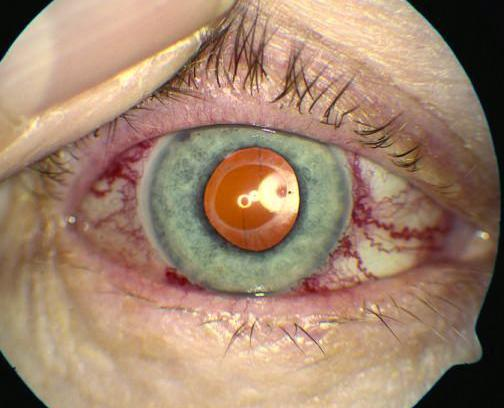
dilated blood vessels in the eye in CCF

CCF symptoms include bruit (a humming sound within the skull due to high blood flow through the arteriovenous fistula), progressive visual loss, and pulsatile proptosis or progressive bulging of the eye due to dilatation of the veins draining the eye. Pain is the symptom that patients often find the most difficult to tolerate.

Patients usually present with sudden or insidious onset of redness in one eye, associated with progressive proptosis or bulging. They may have a history of similar episodes in the past.

== Causes ==
Carotid cavernous fistulae may form following closed or penetrating head trauma, surgical damage, rupture of an intracavernous aneurysm, or in association with connective tissue disorders, vascular diseases and dural fistulas.

== Diagnosis ==
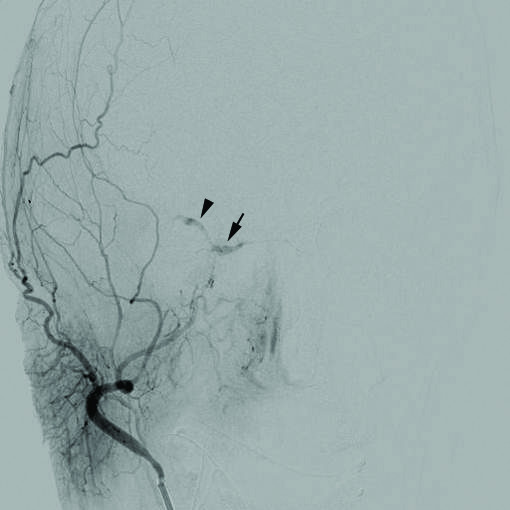
Selective angiography of the external carotid artery showing an indirect type D right carotid cavernous fistula, filling of the cavernous sinus (arrow) and retrograde drainage into the right superior ophthalmic vein (arrowhead)

This is based on MRI scan, magnetic resonance angiography and CT scan. A cerebral digital subtraction angiography (DSA) enhances visualization of the fistula.

- CT scans classically show an enlarged superior ophthalmic vein, cavernous sinus enlargement ipsilateral (same side) as the abnormality and possibly diffuse enlargement of all the extraocular muscles resulting from venous engorgement.
- Selective arteriography is used to evaluate arteriovenous fistulas.
- High resolution digital subtraction angiography may help in classifying CCF into dural and direct type and thus formulate a strategy to treat it either by a balloon or coil or both with or without preservation of parent ipsilateral carotid artery.

=== Classification ===
Various classifications have been proposed for CCF. They may be divided into low-flow or high-flow, traumatic or spontaneous and direct or indirect. The traumatic CCF typically occurs after a basal skull fracture. The spontaneous dural cavernous fistula which is more common usually results from a degenerative process in older patients with systemic hypertension and atherosclerosis. Direct fistulas occur when the Internal Carotid artery (ICA) itself fistulizes into the Cavernous sinus whereas indirect is when a branch of the ICA or External Carotid artery (ECA) communicates with the cavernous sinus.

A popular classification divides CCF into four varieties depending on the type of arterial supply.

Type	Description
A	Fistulous supply from the internal carotid artery
B	Supply from the dural branches of internal carotid artery
C	from meningeal branches of ext carotid artery
D	combined ICA+ECA

== Treatment ==
The mainstay of treatment for CCF is endovascular therapy. This may be transarterial (mostly in the case of direct CCF) or transvenous (most commonly in indirect CCF). Occasionally, more direct approaches, such as direct transorbital puncture of the cavernous sinus or cannulation of the draining superior orbital vein are used when conventional approaches are not possible. Spontaneous resolution of indirect fistulae has been reported but is uncommon. Staged manual compression of the ipsilateral carotid has been reported to assist with spontaneous closure in selected cases.

Direct CCF may be treated by occlusion of the affected cavernous sinus (coils, balloon, liquid agents), or by reconstruction of the damaged internal carotid artery (stent, coils or liquid agents).

Indirect CCF may be treated by occlusion of the affected cavernous sinus with coils, liquid agents or a combination of both.
