= Somatosensory disorder =

- Specialty: Neurology

A somatosensory disorder is an impairment of the somatosensory system.

== Signs and symptoms ==
People may experience numbness, prickling or tingling sensations (paresthesias), or the feeling a limb has "fallen asleep" (an indicator of nerve compression), burning, cutting or other sensations.

=== Seizures ===
Certain types of seizures are associated with the somatosensory system. Cortical injury may lead to loss of thermal sensation or the ability to discriminate pain. An aura involving thermal and painful sensations is a phenomenon known to precede the onset of an epileptic seizure or focal seizure. Another type of seizure, called a sensory Jacksonian seizure involves an abnormal, localizable, cutaneous sensation but does not have apparent stimulus. This sensation may progress along a limb or to adjacent cutaneous body areas, reflecting abnormal neuronal firing in the postcentral gyrus where an epileptic discharge is propagated. These episodes in which patients are consciously aware during a seizure have been useful for identifying problems associated with the somatosensory cortex. Patients can describe the nature of the seizure and how they feel during it.

== Mechanism ==
The absence of proprioception or two-point tactile discrimination on one side of the body suggests injury to the contralateral side of the primary somatosensory cortex. However, depending on the extent of the injury, damage can range in loss of proprioception of an individual limb or the entire body. A deficit known as cortical astereognosis of the receptive type describes an inability to make use of tactile sensory information for identifying objects placed in the hand. For example, if this type of injury effects the hand region in the primary somatosensory cortex for one cerebral hemisphere, a patient with closed eyes cannot perceive the position of the fingers on the contralateral hand and will not be able to identify objects such as keys or a cell phone if they are placed into that hand.

== Diagnosis ==
Evaluation of any suspected disease of the somatosensory system is included in a neurological examination of the peripheral nervous system. Modern techniques for testing somatosensory function are still quite crude compared to testing motor function. Evaluation of somatosensory stimuli are limited by the patient's interpretation of sensation in response to testing.

Tactile sensation is tested with a cotton wisp or light touch with a finger. Pain is assessed by pinprick or pinwheel (Wartenberg wheel). A 128 Hz tuning fork is used for testing vibrations.
