= Pneumocephalus =

Air or gas in the cranial cavity

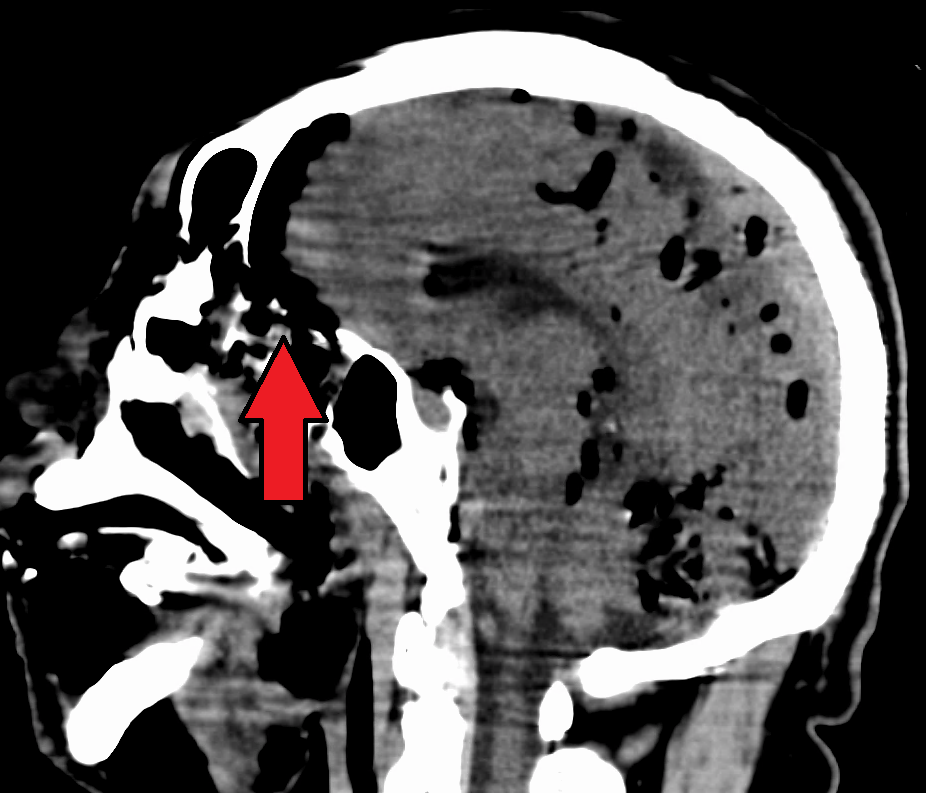
- Pneumocephalus and comminuted fracture of the frontal sinus

Pneumocephalus is the presence of air or gas within the cranial cavity. It is usually associated with disruption of the skull: after head and facial trauma, tumors of the skull base, after neurosurgery or otorhinolaryngology, and rarely, spontaneously. Pneumocephalus can occur in scuba diving, but is very rare in this context.

If there is a valve mechanism which allows air to enter the skull but prevents it from escaping, a tension pneumocephalus can occur (similar to what can happen in a tension pneumothorax).

CT scans of patients with a tension pneumocephalus typically show air that compresses the frontal lobes of the brain, which results in a tented appearance of the brain in the skull known as the Mount Fuji sign. The name is derived from the resemblance of the brain to Mount Fuji in Japan, a volcano known for its symmetrical cone. In typical cases, there is a symmetrical depression near the midline (such as the crater of a volcano), due to intact bridging veins. Its occurrence seems to be limited to tension pneumocephalus (not occurring in pneumocephalus without tension). The sign was first described by a team of Japanese neurosurgeons.

Pneumocephalus has also been shown to follow neurosurgical procedures such as deep brain stimulation and hematoma evacuation (e.g., chronic subdural hematoma), where while seemingly innocuous to the patient, may cause brain shift, subsequent stereotactic inaccuracy, and even another surgical intervention. Regarding chronic subdural hematoma (CSDH) surgery, a postoperative volume of pneumocephalus greater than 15mL puts a patient at increased risk of CSDH recurrence; in fact, for every milliliter of air entering the cranial cavity after CSDH evacuation, the recurrence risk increases by 4%. Efforts are made by neurosurgeons to reduce pneumocephalus volume during surgery, and thus, subsequent brain shift.

== Pneumorrhachis ==
Pneumorrhachis' is a medical condition in which air has entered the spinal canal; it can also be associated with concomitant pneumocephalus. Only eight cases with pneumorrhachis extending to more than one spinal region had been reported in the literature. Gordon had initially described the phenomenon of intraspinal air. The term pneumorrhachis was used for the first time by Newbold et al. The two subtypes of pneumorrhachis, which includes epidural or subarachnoid, are difficult to distinguish even with CT scanning. However, the presence of pneumocephalus goes more in favor of subarachnoid subtype. Goh and Yeo in their study have reported that the epidural pneumorrhachis is self-limited, whereas the more common subarachnoid pneumorrhachis type may be complicated by tension pneumocephalus and meningitis. Pneumorrhachis typically resolves spontaneously but occasionally it can have serious complications.

=== Traumatic subarachnoid pneumorrhachis ===
Traumatic subarachnoid pneumorrhachis is almost always secondary to major trauma and is a marker of a severe injury. For example, air may migrate via the neural foramina behind the driving pressure of pneumothorax. The pathophysiology described for it states that the penetrated air, which had led to the formation of pneumocephalus might have been forced caudally due to the raised intracranial pressure as a consequence of severe brain injury and patient's horizontal position allowing the entrapped air to pass through the foramen magnum into the spinal canal. Due to its rareness, asymptomatic presentation and myriad etiologies, no guidelines for its treatment or care has been described. Patient with subarachnoid pneumorrhachis should be treated meticulously and a temporary lumbar drainage may be required if they have concomitant cerebro-spinal fluid leak.

== Additional images ==
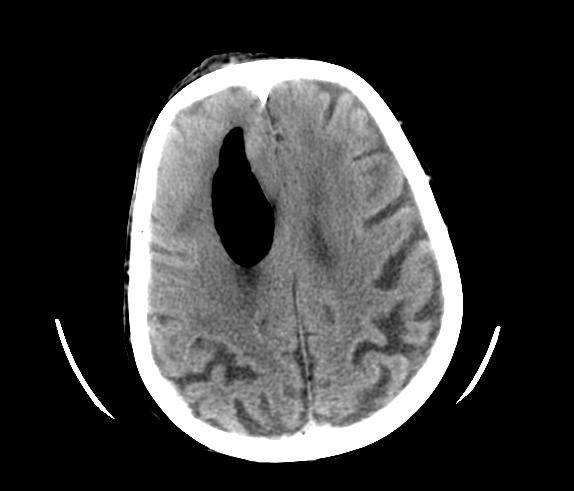
Large pneumocephaly secondary to surgical wound

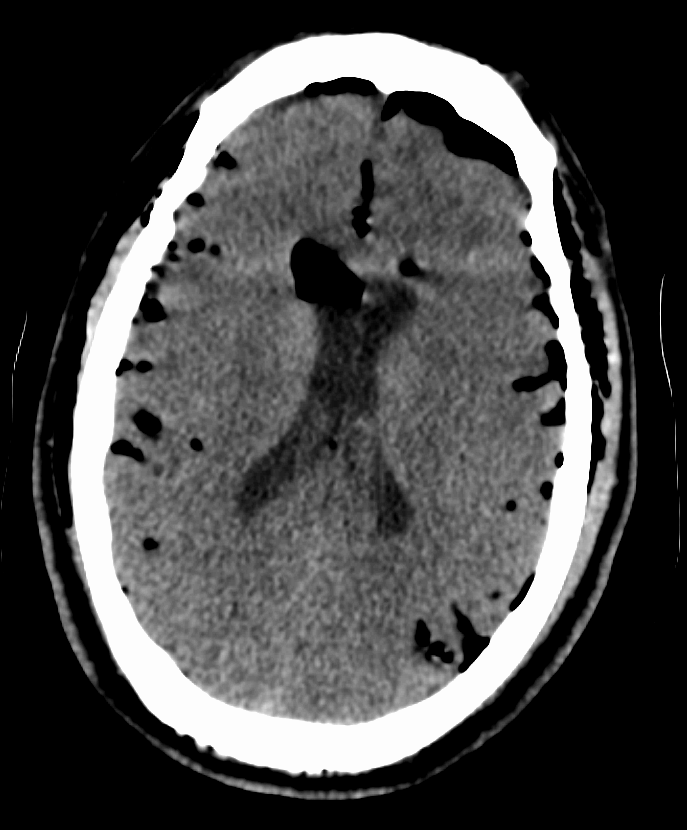
Pneumocephaly
