= Arachnoid cyst =

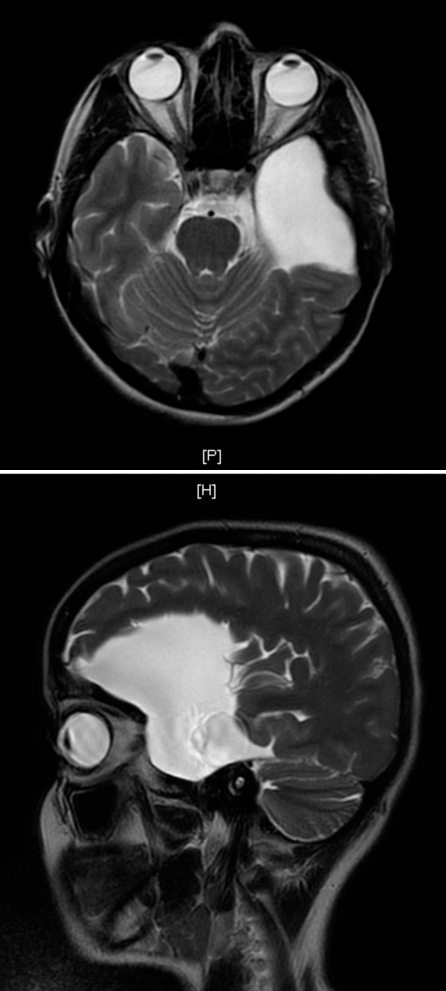
- An MRI of a 25-year-old woman with left frontotemporal arachnoid cyst
- Specialty: Neurosurgery

Arachnoid cysts are cerebrospinal fluid covered by arachnoidal cells and collagen that may develop between the surface of the brain and the cranial base or on the arachnoid membrane, one of the three meningeal layers that cover the brain and the spinal cord. Primary arachnoid cysts are a congenital disorder whereas secondary arachnoid cysts are the result of head injury or trauma. Most cases of primary cysts begin during infancy; however, onset may be delayed until adolescence.

== Signs and symptoms ==
Patients with arachnoid cysts may never show symptoms, even in some cases where the cyst is large. Therefore, while the presence of symptoms may provoke further clinical investigation, symptoms independent of further data cannot—and should not—be interpreted as evidence of a cyst's existence, size, location, or potential functional impact on the patient.

Symptoms vary by the size and location of the cyst(s), though small cysts usually have no symptoms and are discovered only incidentally. On the other hand, a number of symptoms may result from large cysts:

- Cranial deformation or macrocephaly (enlargement of the head), particularly in children
- Cysts in the suprasellar region in children have presented as bobbing and nodding of the head called bobble-head doll syndrome.
- Cysts in the left middle cranial fossa have been associated with ADHD in a study on affected children.
- Headaches. A patient experiencing a headache does not necessarily have an arachnoid cyst.
  - In a 2002 study involving 78 patients with a migraine or tension-type headache, CT scans showed abnormalities in over a third of the patients, though arachnoid cysts only accounted for 2.6% of patients in this study.
  - A study found 18% of patients with intracranial arachnoid cysts had non-specific headaches. The cyst was in the temporal location in 75% of these cases.
- Seizures
- Hydrocephalus (excessive accumulation of cerebrospinal fluid)
- Increased intracranial pressure
- Developmental delay
- Behavioral changes
- Nausea
- Dysdiadokinesis
- Hemiparesis (weakness or paralysis on one side of the body)
- Ataxia (lack of muscle control)
- Musical hallucination
- Pre-senile dementia, a condition often associated with Alzheimer's disease
- In elderly patients (>80 years old) symptoms were similar to chronic subdural hematoma or normal pressure hydrocephalus:
  - Dementia
  - Urinary incontinence
  - Hemiparesis
  - Headache
  - Seizures

=== Location-specific symptoms ===
- A supratentorial arachnoid cyst can mimic a Ménière's disease attack.
- Frontal arachnoid cysts have been associated with depression.
- Cysts on the left temporal lobe have been associated with psychosis. A left fronto-temporal cyst showed symptoms of alexithymia.
- Cyst on the right sylvian fissure resulted in new onset of schizophrenia-like symptoms at age 61.
- A patient with a cyst on the left middle cranial fossa had auditory hallucinations, migraine-like headaches, and periodic paranoia
- Patients with left temporal lobe cysts had mood disturbances similar to manic depression (bipolar disorder) and were known to show outward aggression

== Causes ==
The exact cause of arachnoid cysts is not known. Researchers believe that most cases of arachnoid cysts are developmental malformations that arise from the unexplained splitting or tearing of the arachnoid membrane.In some cases, arachnoid cysts occurring in the middle fossa are accompanied by underdevelopment (hypoplasia) or compression of the temporal lobe. The exact role that temporal lobe abnormalities play in the development of middle fossa arachnoid cysts is unknown.

There are some cases where hereditary disorders have been connected with arachnoid cysts.

Some complications of arachnoid cysts can occur when a cyst is damaged because of minor head trauma. Trauma can cause the fluid within a cyst to leak into other areas (e.g., subarachnoid space). Blood vessels on the surface of a cyst may tear and bleed into the cyst (intracystic hemorrhage), increasing its size. If a blood vessel bleeds on the outside of a cyst, a collection of blood (hematoma) may result. In the cases of intracystic hemorrhage and hematoma, the individual may have symptoms of increased pressure within the cranium and signs of compression of nearby nerve (neural) tissue.

Some scientists debate whether arachnoid cysts are a true congenital condition or if this should be separated from secondary cysts. A recent study shows differences in communication between the arachnoid cyst and the subarachnoid space by CT cisternography. A comparison of arachnoid cyst fluid and CSF in a series of patients show differences in chemical composition.

Arachnoid cysts can also occur secondary to other disorders such as Marfan syndrome, arachnoiditis, or agenesis of the corpus callosum.

== Diagnosis ==
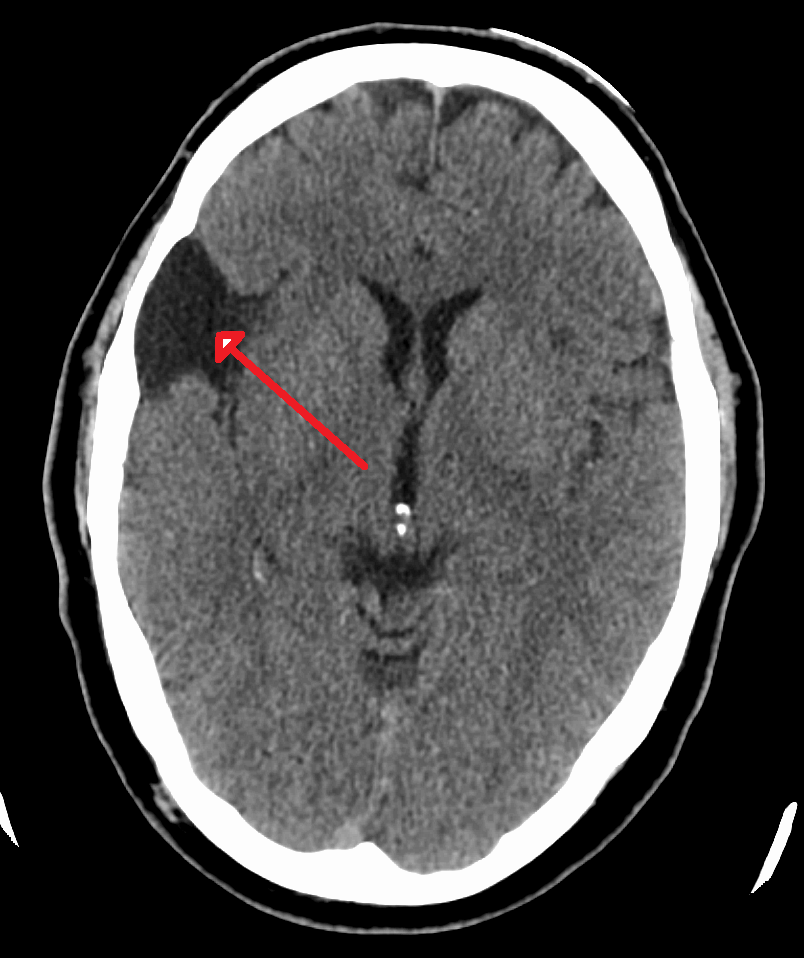
Arachnoid cyst as seen on a CT image of the brain

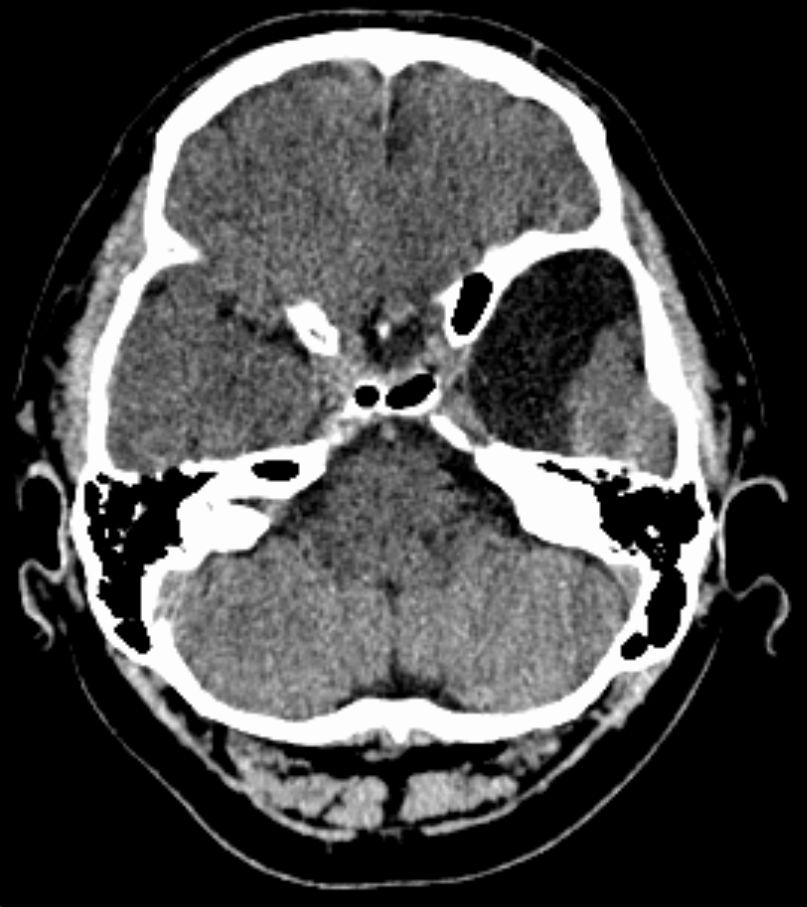
Axial CT showing a typical arachnoid cyst left temporal

Diagnosis is principally by MRI. Frequently, arachnoid cysts are incidental findings on MRI scans performed for other clinical reasons. In practice, diagnosis of symptomatic arachnoid cysts requires symptoms to be present, and many with the disorder never develop symptoms.

Additional clinical assessment tools that can be useful in evaluating a patient with arachnoid cysts include the mini-mental state examination (MMSE), a brief questionnaire-based test used to assess cognition.

=== Classification ===
Arachnoid cysts can be found on the brain or on the spine. Intracranial arachnoid cysts usually occur adjacent to the arachnoidal cistern. Spinal arachnoid cysts may be extradural, intradural, or perineural and tend to present with signs and symptoms indicative of a radiculopathy.

Arachnoid cysts may also be classified as primary (congenital) or secondary (acquired) and have been reported in humans, cats, and dogs.Arachnoid cysts can be relatively asymptomatic or present with insidious symptoms; for this reason, diagnosis is often delayed.

== Treatment ==
Most arachnoid cysts are asymptomatic and do not require treatment. Treatment may be necessary when symptomatic. A variety of procedures may be used to decompress (remove pressure from) the cyst.

- Surgical placement of a cerebral shunt:
  - An internal shunt drains into the subdural compartment.
  - A cystoperitoneal shunt drains to the peritoneal cavity.
- Fenestration:
  - Craniotomy with excision
  - Various endoscopic techniques are proving effective, including laser-assisted techniques.
- Drainage by needle aspiration or burr hole.
- Capsular resection
- Pharmacological treatments may address specific symptoms such as seizures or pain.

== Prognosis ==
Most arachnoid cysts are asymptomatic, and do not require treatment. Where complications are present, leaving arachnoid cysts untreated may cause permanent severe neurological damage due to the progressive expansion of the cyst(s) or hemorrhage (bleeding). However, with treatment most individuals with symptomatic arachnoid cysts do well.

More specific prognoses are listed below:

- Patients with impaired preoperative cognition had postoperative improvement after surgical decompression of the cyst.
- Surgery can resolve psychiatric manifestations in selected cases.

== Epidemiology ==
Arachnoid cysts are seen in up to 1.1% of the population with a gender distribution of 2:1 male:female. Only 20% of these have symptoms, usually from secondary hydrocephalus.A study that looked at 2,536 healthy young males found a prevalence of 1.7% (95% CI 1.2 to 2.3%). Only a small percentage of the detected abnormalities require urgent medical attention.

== See also ==
- Acoustic neuroma
- Arachnoiditis
- Brain tumor
- Dandy–Walker syndrome
- Empty sella syndrome
- Porencephaly
- Syringomyelia
- Hyperprolactinemia
- Panhypopituitarism
- Arnold–Chiari malformation
- Hydrocephalus
