= Sinus pericranii =

- Specialty: Vascular surgery

Sinus pericranii (SP) is a rare disorder characterized by a congenital (or occasionally, acquired) epicranial venous malformation of the scalp. Treatment of this condition has mainly been recommended for aesthetic reasons and prevention of bleeding.

== Signs and symptoms ==
Sinus pericranii typically presents as soft palpable masses along the midline skull, which may fluctuate in size depending on body positioning.

== Cause ==
The nature of this malformation remains unclear. Congenital, spontaneous, and acquired origins are accepted. No evidence of associated anomalies, such as cerebral venous malformations, systemic angiomas, venous angioma dural malformations, internal cerebral vein aneurysms, and cavernous hemangiomas support the hypothesis of a spontaneous origin in the current case of SP.

== Mechanism ==
Sinus pericranii is a venous anomaly where communication between the intracranial dural sinuses and dilated epicranial venous structures exists. That venous anomaly is a collection of non-muscular venous blood vessels adhering tightly to the skull's outer surface and directly communicating with intracranial venous sinuses through diploic veins. The venous collections receive blood from and drain into the intracranial venous sinuses. The varicosities are intimately associated with the periosteum, are distensible, and vary in size when changes in intracranial pressure occur.

== Treatment ==
The surgical treatment involves the resection of the extra-cranial venous package and ligation of the emissary communicating vein. In some cases of SP, surgical excision is performed for cosmetic reasons. The endovascular technique has been described by a transvenous approach combined with a direct puncture and the recent endovascular embolization with Onyx.

== See also ==
- Mondor's disease
- List of cutaneous conditions
