= WHO classification of tumours of the central nervous system =

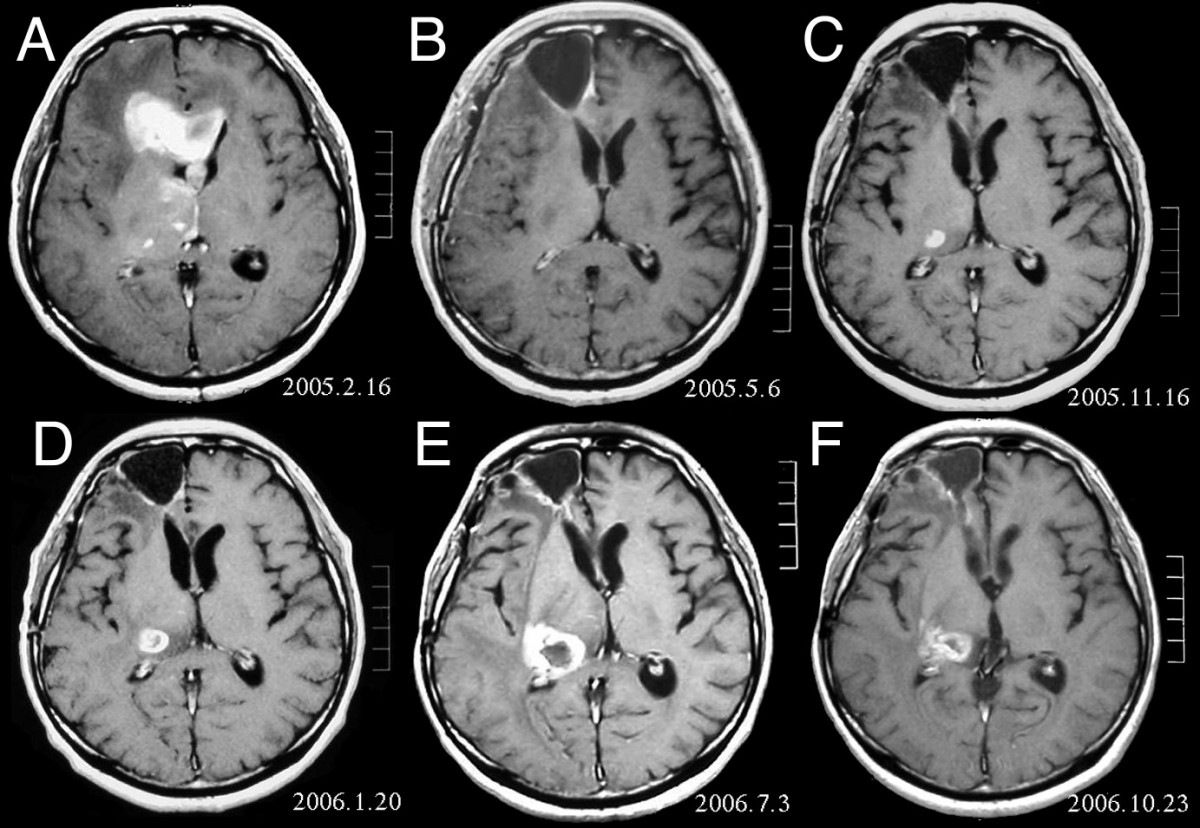
MRI of a patient with anaplastic astrocytoma

The WHO classification of tumours of the central nervous system is a World Health Organization Blue Book that defines, describes and classifies tumours of the central nervous system (CNS).

As of 2023, clinicians are using the 5th edition, which incorporates recent advances in molecular pathology. The books lists ICD-O codes, CNS WHO grades and describes epidemiological, clinical, macroscopic and histopathological features, among others. The following is a simplified (deprecated) version of the fifth edition.

== Types ==
=== 1. Gliomas, glioneuronal tumors, and neuronal tumours ===
1.1 Adult-type diffuse gliomas

1.1.1 Astrocytoma, IDH-mutant
1.1.2 Oligodendroglioma, IDH-mutant, and 1p/19q-codeleted
1.1.3 Glioblastoma, IDH-wildtype

1.2 Pediatric-type diffuse low-grade gliomas

1.2.1 Diffuse astrocytoma, MYB- or MYBL1-altered
1.2.2 Angiocentric glioma
1.2.3 Polymorphous low-grade neuroepithelial tumor of the young (PLNTY)
1.2.4 Diffuse low-grade glioma, MAPK pathway-altered

1.3 Pediatric-type diffuse high-grade gliomas

1.3.1 Diffuse midline glioma, H3 K27-altered
1.3.2 Diffuse hemispheric glioma, H3 G34-mutant
1.3.3 Diffuse pediatric-type high-grade glioma, H3-wildtype and IDH-wildtype
1.3.4 Infant-type hemispheric glioma

1.4 Circumscribed astrocytic gliomas

1.4.1 Pilocytic astrocytoma
1.4.2 High-grade astrocytoma with piloid features
1.4.3 Pleomorphic xanthoastrocytoma
1.4.4 Subependymal giant cell astrocytoma
1.4.5 Chordoid glioma
1.4.6 Astroblastoma, MN1-altered

1.5 Glioneuronal and neuronal tumours

1.5.1 Ganglioglioma
1.5.2 Desmoplastic infantile ganglioglioma / desmoplastic infantile astrocytoma
1.5.3 Dysembryoplastic neuroepithelial tumor
1.5.4 Diffuse glioneuronal tumor with oligodendroglioma-like features and nuclear clusters
1.5.5 Papillary glioneuronal tumor
1.5.6 Rosette-forming glioneuronal tumor
1.5.7 Myxoid glioneuronal tumor
1.5.8 Diffuse leptomeningeal glioneuronal tumor
1.5.9 Gangliocytoma
1.5.10 Multinodular and vacuolating neuronal tumor
1.5.11 Dysplastic cerebellar gangliocytoma (Lhermitte-Duclos disease)
1.5.12 Central neurocytoma
1.5.13 Extraventricular neurocytoma
1.5.14 Cerebellar liponeurocytoma

1.6 Ependymal tumours

1.6.1 Supratentorial ependymoma

1.6.1.1 Supratentorial ependymoma, ZFTA fusion-positive
1.6.1.2 Supratentorial ependymoma, YAP1 fusion-positive

1.6.2 Posterior fossa ependymoma

1.6.2.1 Posterior fossa ependymoma, group PFA
1.6.2.2 Posterior fossa ependymoma, group PFB

1.6.3 Spinal ependymoma

1.6.3.1 Spinal ependymoma, MYCN-amplified

1.6.4 Myxopapillary ependymoma
1.6.5 Subependymoma

=== 2. Choroid plexus tumours ===
2.1 Choroid plexus papilloma
2.2 Atypical choroid plexus papilloma
2.3 Choroid plexus carcinoma

=== 3. Embryonal tumours ===
3.1 Medulloblastoma
3.2 Atypical teratoid/rhabdoid tumour
3.3 Cribiform neuroepithelial tumour
3.4 Embryonal tumour with multilayered rosettes
3.5 CNS neuroblastoma, FOXR2-activated
3.6 CNS tumor with BCOR internal tandem duplication

=== 4. Pineal tumours ===
4.1 Pineocytoma
4.2 Pineal parenchymal tumour of intermediate differentiation
4.3 Pineoblastoma
4.4 Papillary tumor of the pineal region
4.5 Desmoplastic myxoid tumour of the pineal region, SMARCB1-mutant

=== 5. Cranial and paraspinal nerve tumours ===
5.1 Schwannoma
5.2 Neurofibroma
5.3 Perineurioma
5.4 Hybrid nerve sheath tumour
5.5 Malignant melanotic nerve sheath tumour
5.6 Malignant peripheral nerve sheath tumour
5.7 Paraganglioma

=== 6. Meningioma ===
Subtypes:
6.1 Meningothelial meningioma
6.2 Fibrous meningioma
6.3 Transitional meningioma
6.4 Psammomatous meningioma
6.5 Angiomatus meningioma
6.6 Microcystic meningioma
6.7 Secretory meningioma
6.8 Lymphoplasmacyte-rich meningioma
6.9 Metaplastic meningioma
6.10 Chordoid meningioma
6.11 Clear cell meningioma
6.12 Atypical meningioma
6.13 Papillary meningioma
6.14 Rhabdoid meningioma
6.15 Anaplastic (malignant) meningioma

=== 7. Mesenchymal, non-meningothelial tumours ===
7.1 Soft tissue tumours

7.1.1 Fibroblastic and myofibroblastic tumours

7.1.1.1 Solitary fibrous tumour

7.1.2 Vascular tumours

7.1.2.1 Hemangiomas and vascular malformations
7.1.2.2 Hemangioblastoma

7.1.3 Skeletal muscle tumours

7.1.3.1 Rhabdomyosarcoma

7.1.4 Uncertain differentiation

7.1.4.1 Intracranial mesenchymal tumour, FET-CREB fusion-positive
7.1.4.2 CIC-rearranged sarcoma
7.1.4.3 Primary intracranial sarcoma, DICER1-mutant
7.1.4.4 Ewing sarcoma

7.2 Chondro-osseous tumours

7.2.1 Chondrogenic tumours

7.2.1.1 Mesenchymal chondrosarcoma
7.2.1.2 Chondrosarcoma

7.2.2 Notochordal tumours

7.2.2.1 Chordoma (including poorly differentiated chordoma)

=== 8. Melanocytic tumours ===
8.1 Diffuse meningeal melanocytic neoplasms

8.1.1 Meningeal melanocytosis and meningeal melanomatosis

8.2 Circumscribed meningeal melanocytic neoplasms

8.2.1 Meningeal melanocytoma and meningeal melanoma

=== 9. Hematolymphoid tumours ===
9.1 Lymphomas

9.1.1 CNS lymphomas

9.1.1.1 Primary diffuse large B-cell lymphoma of the CNS
9.1.1.2 Immunodeficiency-associated CNS lymphoma
9.1.1.3 Lymphomatoid granulomatosis
9.1.1.4 Intravascular large B-cell lymphoma

9.1.2 Miscellaneous rare lymphomas in the CNS

9.1.2.1 MALT lymphoma of the dura
9.1.2.2 Other low-grade B-cell lymphomas of the CNS
9.1.2.3 Anaplastic large cell lymphoma (ALK+/ALK−)
9.1.2.4 T-cell lymphomas and NK/T-cell lymphomas

9.2 Histiocytic tumors

9.2.1 Erdheim–Chester disease
9.2.2 Rosai–Dorfman disease
9.2.3 Juvenile xanthogranuloma
9.2.4 Langerhans cell histiocytosis
9.2.5 Histiocytic sarcoma

=== 10. Germ cell tumours ===
10.1 Mature teratoma
10.2 Immature teratoma
10.3 Teratoma with somatic-type malignancy
10.4 Germinoma
10.5 Embryonal carcinoma
10.6 Yolk sac tumor
10.7 Choriocarcinoma
10.8 Mixed germ cell tumor

=== 11. Tumors of the sellar region ===
11.1 Adamantinomatous craniopharyngioma
11.2 Papillary craniopharyngioma
11.3 Pituicytoma, granular cell tumor of the sellar region, and spindle cell oncocytoma
11.4 Pituitary adenoma/PitNET
11.5 Pituitary blastoma

=== 12. Metastases to the CNS ===
12.1 Metastases to the brain and spinal cord parenchyma
12.2 Metastases to the meninges

== Terminology ==
The 5th WHO classification delineates distinct types of tumors, some of them being further divided into subtypes, rendering the former terms entity and variant obsolete. When molecular diagnostics are not complete enough to allow precise classification, diagnosis should be designated by appending not otherwise specified (NOS). In case of a full molecular workup which does not match any of the standard WHO diagnosis, tumors are to be labeled not elsewhere classified (NEC).

== History ==
=== 1979 WHO classification (1st edition) ===
Zülch, Histological typing of tumours of the central nervous system. World Health Organization, Geneva

=== 1993 WHO classification (2nd edition) ===
reflected the advances brought about by the introduction of immunohistochemistry into diagnostic pathology

Kleihues P, Burger PC, Scheithauer BW (eds) (1993) Histological typing of tumours of the central nervous system. World Health Organization international histological classification of tumours. Springer, Heidelberg

=== 2000 WHO classification (3rd edition) ===
edited by Kleihues and Cavenee

Kleihues P, Cavenee WK (eds) (2000) World Health Organization Classification of Tumours. Pathology and genetics of tumours of the nervous system. IARC Press

=== 2007 WHO classification (4th edition) ===
This is the classification that began to suggest the use genetic information for classification.

=== 2016 WHO classification (4th revised edition) ===
This was a substantial revision of the 4th edition. The reason it is not the 5th edition is that additions to the CNS volume were needed even though WHO was not up to 5th editions yet.

=== 2021 WHO classification (5th edition) ===
The 5th edition incorporated many of the proposed changes outlined by the cIMPACT-NOW (the Consortium to Inform Molecular and Practical Approaches to CNS Tumor Taxonomy - Not Official WHO).

=== WHO Classification of Tumours (Online Edition) ===
Since February 19, 2020, the WHO tumors classification has been accessible online as a subscription service, which includes the revised 4th edition.
