= TMEM81 =

Protein found in humans

Identifiers
- Aliases: TMEM81, HC3107, KVLA2788, UNQ2788, transmembrane protein 81
- External IDs: MGI: 1921876; GeneCards: TMEM81

Gene location (Human)
Chr.	Chromosome 1 (human)
Band	1q32.1	Start	205,083,129 bp
Band	1q32.1	End	205,084,460 bp

Gene location (Mouse)
Chr.	Chromosome 1 (mouse)
Band	1|1 E4	Start	132,433,968 bp
Band	1|1 E4	End	132,436,377 bp
RNA expression pattern
Bgee	Human / Mouse (ortholog); Top expressed in: thymus; testicle; cerebellar hemisphere; right hemisphere of cerebellum; gonad; primary visual cortex; Brodmann area 9; right frontal lobe; granulocyte; gastrocnemius muscle / Top expressed in: spermatid; seminiferous tubule; granulocyte; spermatocyte; embryo; embryo; morula; thymus; bone marrow; mesenteric lymph nodes; More reference expression data
BioGPS	n/a
Orthologs
Databases	NCBI: entry; OMA: entry
Species	Human	Mouse
Entrez	388730	74626
Ensembl	ENSG00000174529	ENSMUSG00000048174
UniProt	Q6P7N7	Q9D5K1
RefSeq (mRNA)	NM_203376	NM_029025
RefSeq (protein)	NP_976310	NP_083301
Location (UCSC)	Chr 1: 205.08 – 205.08 Mb	Chr 1: 132.43 – 132.44 Mb
PubMed search
- Wikidata
View/Edit Human	View/Edit Mouse

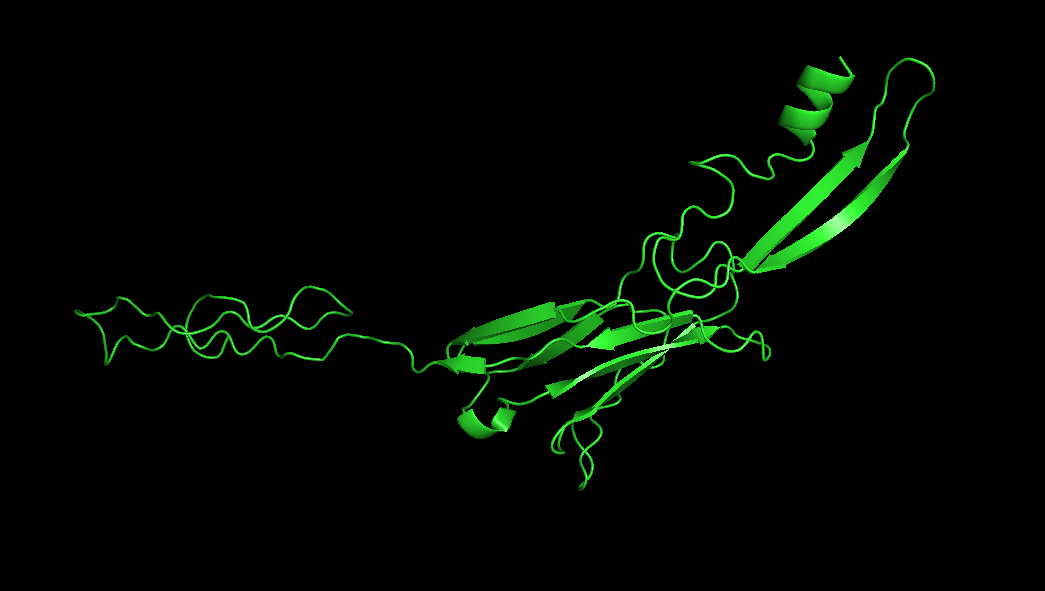
Predicted tertiary structure of TMEM81 (extracellular region only) from I-TASSER. The structure was visualized using PyMol.

Transmembrane Protein 81 or TMEM81 is a protein that in humans is encoded by the TMEM81 gene. TMEM81 is a poorly-characterized transmembrane protein which contains an extracellular immunoglobulin domain.

== Gene ==
TMEM81 is also known as HC3107, UNQ2788, KVLA2788, or MGC75217. In humans, TMEM81 is located on chromosomal band 1q32.1 between the genes CNTN2 and RBBP5 on the reverse strand. The TMEM81 gene is 1332 base pairs long and encodes one transcript containing a single exon.

The predicted promoter region (GXP_180875) for TMEM81 is 1158 bp long and extends from 205,084,360 to 205,085,517 on the reverse strand.

== Protein ==
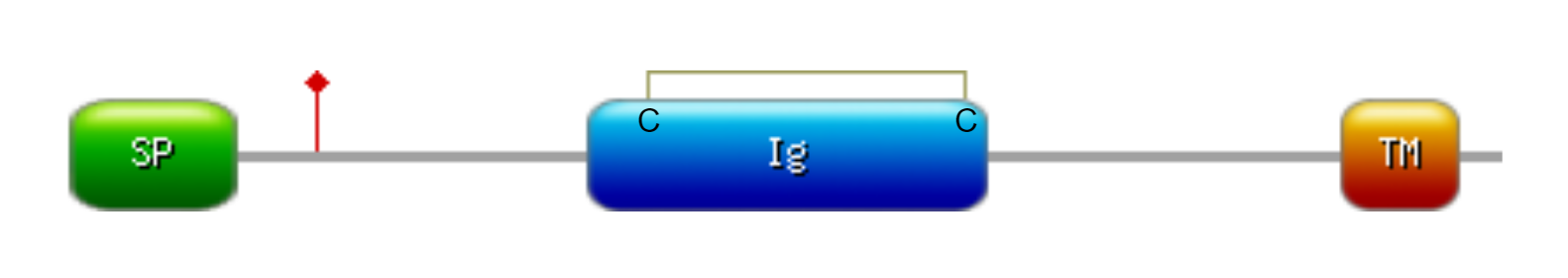
Schematic illustration of the TMEM81 peptide

The TMEM81 precursor peptide is 255 amino acids long with a predicted molecular weight of 28.5 kDa and pI = 8.92.

The protein contains a helical transmembrane region, an extracellular immunoglobulin domain, and an N-linked glycosylation site. A disulfide bridge is predicted to form between residues Cys104 and Cys156.

=== Protein composition ===
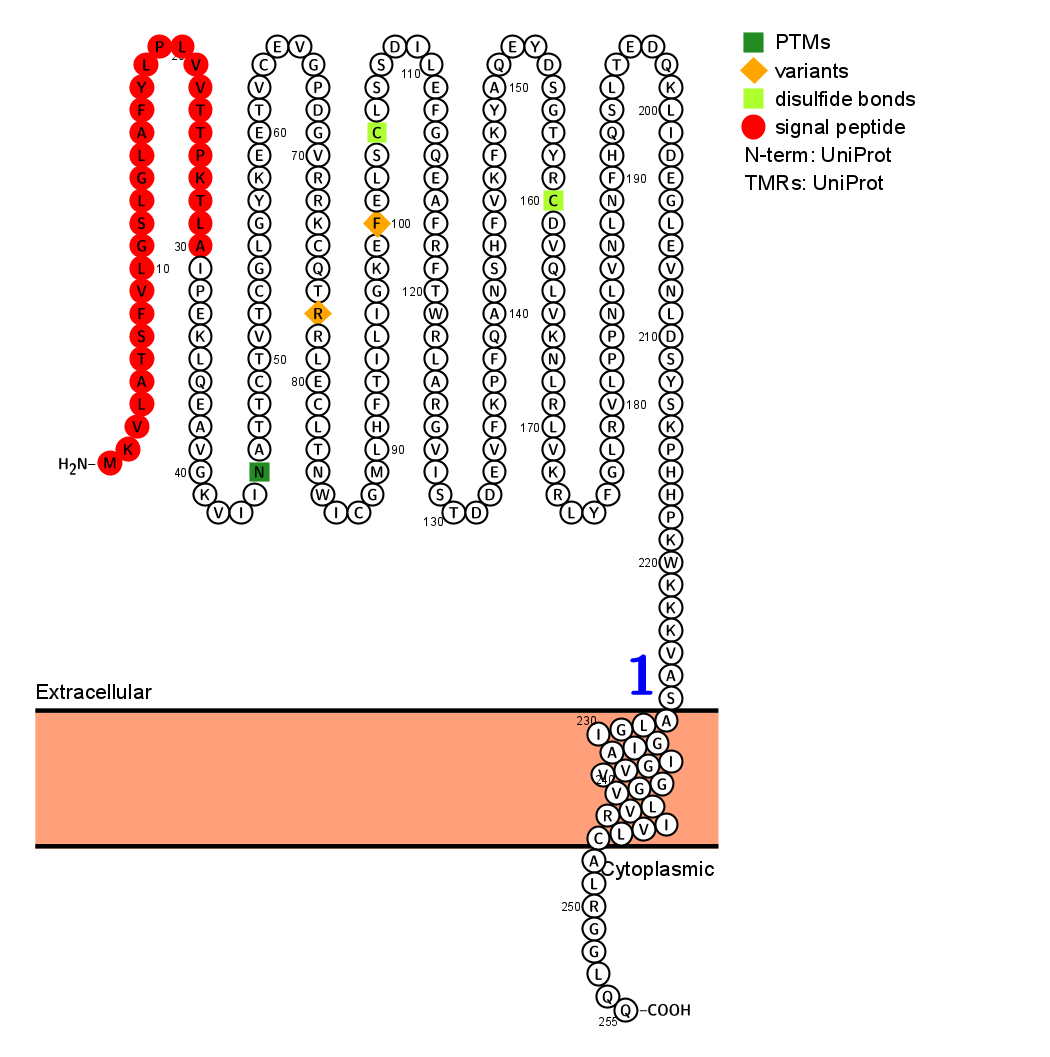
Illustration of the human TMEM81 peptide created using Protter

The mature form (signal peptide removed) of TMEM81 has a slightly increased valine and somewhat decreased methionine composition relative to average proteins. TMEM81 also contains three charge runs, each of which are three amino acids long:

Charge	Amino acids	Location
+	Arg-Arg-Lys	71–73
-	Asp-Asp-Glu	131–133
+	Lys-Lys-Lys	221–223

=== Secondary structure ===
The extracellular region of TMEM81 is predicted to be composed of beta sheets while the intracellular region likely assumes an alpha helix conformation. The transmembrane region of TMEM81 is helical. An alignment of mature TMEM81 peptide sequences in H. sapiens, M. musculus and G. gallus was used to predict the secondary structure of TMEM81 using Ali2D.

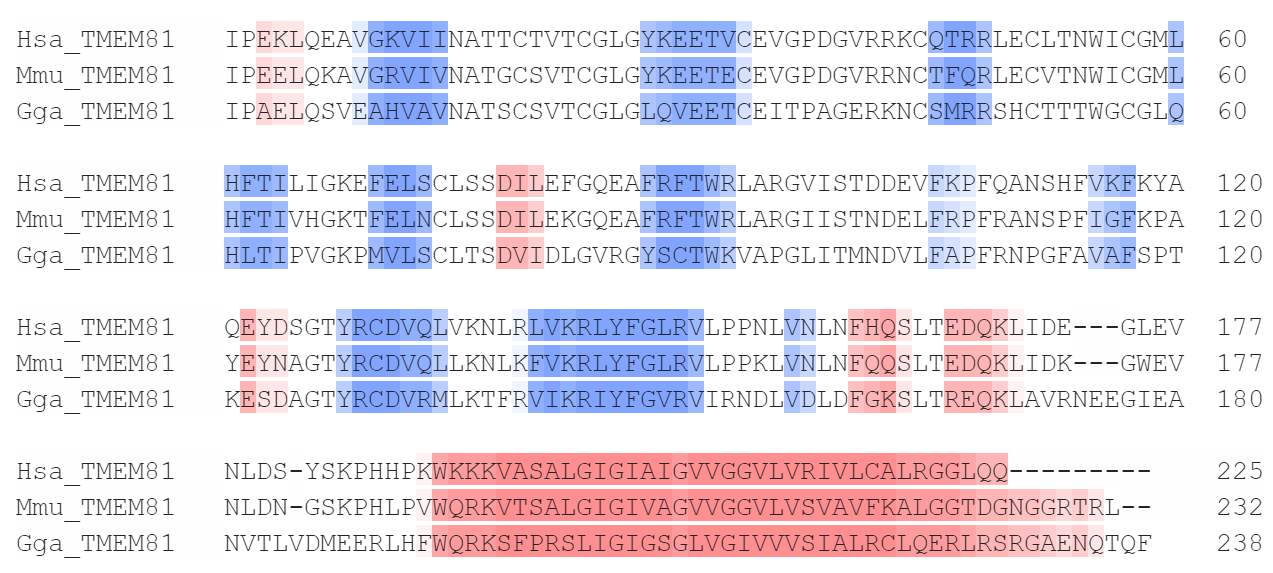

In predication results given above, blue indicates beta strands while red indicates alpha helices. Color saturation is proportional to the confidence of the predication.

=== Tertiary structure ===
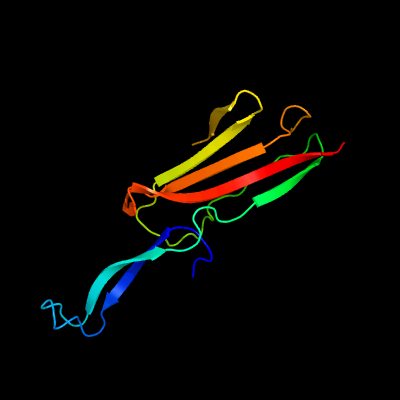
TMEM81 predicted tertiary structure (Phyre2)

The tertiary structure of TMEM81 has been predicted using izumo sperm-egg fusion protein 1 as a template. The image on the right depicts a model of residues 19 to 152 with 97.3% confidence with 56% coverage obtained using Phyre2. The red-to-blue color gradation indicates the N- to C-terminus directionality of the structure.

=== Post-translational modifications ===
Experimental evidence has been found for an N-glycosylation site located at Asn45 indicating that TMEM81 is a glycoprotein. Several tyrosine residues within TMEM81 have been predicted to undergo sulfation.

=== Subcellular location ===
TMEM81 is predicted to be localized to the plasma membrane. However, immunohistochemistry experiments using TMEM81-specific antibodies found localization to intermediate filaments and microfilaments.

== Expression ==
=== Expression in humans ===
RNA-seq experiments from the GTEx project found that TMEM81 is ubiquitously expressed in humans but shows enhanced expression in the cerebellum and cerebellar hemisphere. Other tissues and organs showing somewhat enhanced mRNA expression include the testis and spleen.

=== Expression in rodents ===
In mice (M. musculus) and rats (R. norvegicus), TMEM81 shows enhanced expression in the testes and relatively low expression in other tissues. Additionally, TMEM81 expression is not localized to the cerebellum in mice.

TMEM81 shows monoallelic expression in both H. sapiens and M. musculus.

=== Protein expression ===
In both H. sapiens and M. musculus, TMEM81 is present at a concentration of just under 1 ppm. Relative to other proteins, TMEM81 is present at slightly below the median protein concentration level.

== Clinical Significance ==
Methylation changes in TMEM81 are associated with an increased risk of intermittent explosive disorder. Additionally, SNPs located in TMEM81 affect thrombopoiesis, mean platelet volume, and have been implicated in Meniere’s disease.

=== Cancer ===
The 1q32.1 region showed copy number gain with a frequency of 68.9% in a study of 46 breast cancers and was gained in a case of extraventricular central neurocytoma. TMEM81 also has been implicated in the development of hepatocellular carcinoma.

== Homology ==
No paralogs of the TMEM81 gene exist in humans. Orthologs of the gene have been found in various lineages of gnathostomes with the most distantly orthologs found among chondrichthyes. TMEM81 orthologs have not been detected among agnatha, lancelets, tunicates, or invertebrates.

Taxonomic name	Common name	Date of divergence (mya)	NCBI Accession #	Length (aa)	Identity (%)
Homo sapiens	Human	0	NP_976310	255	100
Mus musculus	Mouse	89	NP_083301.1	259	69.8
Tursiops truncatus	Dolphin	94	XP_019773842.1	251	81.4
Loxodonta africana	Elephant	102	XP_023404078.1	276	70.6
Ornithorhynchus anatinus	Platypus	180	XP_001507541.1	281	54.4
Aptenodytes forsteri	Penguin	318	XP_009271191.1	264	45.7
Notechis scutatus	Snake	318	XP_026532625.1	241	41.9
Melopsittacus undulatus	Budgerigar	318	XP_005140927.2	297	36.9
Microcaecilia unicolor	Caecilian	352	XP_030077474.1	266	38.1
Latimeria chalumnae	Coelacanth	414	XP_005989300.1	254	34.4
Amphiprion ocellaris	Clownfish	433	XP_023128675.1	256	24.9
Rhincodon typus	Whale shark	465	XP_020374416.1	257	29.2
