= Embryonal tumour with multilayered rosettes =

Aggressive type of brain cancer

Embryonal tumor with multilayered rosettes (ETMR)
- Other names: Until recently, recognized as medulloepithelioma, ependymoblastoma, and embryonal tumor with abundant neuropil and true rosettes (ETANTR)
- Specialty: Neuro-oncology, neurosurgery
- Usual onset: ~2 years old
- Causes: C19MC amplification
- Diagnostic method: CT scan, MRI scan, tissue biopsy
- Treatment: Surgery, chemotherapy, radiation
- Prognosis: Life expectancy ~ 10 months with treatment (5 year survival <30%)

Embryonal tumor with multilayered rosettes (ETMR) is an embryonal central nervous system tumor. It is considered an embryonal tumor because it arises from cells partially differentiated or still undifferentiated from birth, usually neuroepithelial cells, stem cells destined to turn into glia or neurons. It can occur anywhere within the brain and can have multiple sites of origin, with a high probability of metastasis through cerebrospinal fluid (CSF). Metastases outside the central nervous system have been reported, but remain rare.

Until recently, ETMRs were not recognized as a standalone entity and were grouped together with other CNS primitive neuroectodermal tumors. Histologically, it is similar to other CNS embryonal tumors, such as medulloblastoma, but different regarding genetic factors. It is a rare disease occurring in less than 1 in 700,000 children under the age of 4. Symptoms depend on the location of the tumor and, thus, may vary, but they may include raised intracranial pressure, paresis, seizures, visual impairments, ataxia, and torticollis. A biopsy is needed to establish diagnosis, which is done by molecular analysis of the sample. A standard treatment plan hasn't been established; common strategies involve chemotherapy and radiotherapy for individuals older than 3 years of age. Their efficacy, however, is still controversial. Surgery can be used to remove the tumor, but it often recurs.

== Classification ==
The current (5th) edition of the WHO Classification of Tumors of the Central Nervous System classifies embryonal tumor of the central nervous system into six subtypes: medulloblastoma, cribiform neuroepithelial tumor, embryonal tumor with multilayered rosettes, CNS neuroblastoma, FOXR2-activated, CNS tumor with BCOR internal tandem duplication, and CNS embryonal tumor. This shakeup of the classification (expanded upon from the revised fourth edition, published in 2016) is due to an ongoing effort to better define tumors along their molecular features. Histologically, ETMRs were recognized as separate entities named medulloepithelioma, ependymoblastoma, and embryonal tumor with abundant neuropil and true rosettes (ETANTR). Molecular analysis of these tumors revealed that these tumors all shared many molecular features and thus comprise a single, molecularly defined entity.

== Diagnosis ==
The rate of ETMR is not correlated with sex, occurring equally in children of all sexes. It occurs more often in children under the age of three, and very rarely in children older than ten. The main molecular characteristic of this tumor is amplification of the C19MC microRNA cluster, which is one of the largest miRNA clusters in the human genome, encoding 59 mature miRNAs expressed commonly in the placenta and in some embryonic stem cells. The amplification can be identified using fluorescence in situ hybridization (FISH) or copy number profiling with either SNP arrays, DNA methylation arrays or next generation sequencing (NGS) approaches. Another marker of the disease is high expression of LIN28A, which is often identified using immunohistochemistry and is useful for diagnosis, as it is very rarely seen in other brain tumor entities. Around 10% of ETMRs lack amplification of C19MC, but retain LIN28A expression. Clustering those tumors based on gene expression or DNA methylation profiling reveals they are not molecularly distinct from CN19MC-amplified ETMRs, and often have alterations in other miRNA genes or in miRNA-processing cellular machinery, such as DICER1.

== Management and prognosis ==
Complete resection is often attempted for patients with localized disease. Similar to other malignant CNS tumors occurring in young children, gross total resection may be associated to a survival advantage; however, surgery of a large tumor at a young age is associated with a high risk of complications. In addition, certain tumor locations preclude complete resection. Due to the rarity of the disease, there is no standardized treatment. Current strategies are based on treatments for other embryonal tumors of the CNS. Often, they include combined induction chemotherapy and consolidation with high dose chemotherapy followed by autologous stem cell rescue. Radiation therapy is sometimes attempted, but may result in cognitive impairment in young children. Despite aggressive treatment, the prognosis is poor with 5-year overall survival rates less than 30%. Many patients show quick progression of disease, which is often refractory to treatment.
