= Diffuse leptomeningeal glioneuronal tumor =

Rare primary CNS tumor

Diffuse leptomeningeal glioneuronal tumor (DLGNT) is a rare, primary CNS tumor, classified as distinct entity in 2016 and described as diffuse oligodendroglial-like leptomeningeal tumor of children in the 2016 classification of CNS neoplasms by the WHO., Typically, it's considered juvenile tumors but can occur in adults, the average age of diagnosis is five years. It's characterised by wide leptomeningeal spread with male predominance, like histopathology of neurocytoma, oligodendrocyte-like cytopathology, bland appearance, and severe clinical behaviour. Children's basal cisterns and inter-hemispheric fissures are typically involved in plaque like subarachnoid tumors. A common related intraparenchymal lesion is a spinal lesion. However, in certain situations, superficial parenchyma or Virchow-Robin gaps were affected.
Molecular and genetic investigations frequently show a combination of KIAA1549 and the serine/threonine protein kinase BRAF gene, and also deletions of the short arm of chromosome number 1 and/or the long arm of chromosome number 19.

== Clinical features ==
Patients with DLGNT presented with a variety of clinical manifestations, depending on the involved area of the disease, ranging from, numbness and seizure to hydrocephalus symptoms Irritability, headaches and vomiting. The progression of the disease is slow, however there have been reports of anaplastic transition.

== Diagnosis ==
MRI reveals broad leptomeningeal enhancing and thickness, which is frequently most visible throughout the spine, brainstem, and posterior fossa.
