= Diffuse hemispheric glioma =

- Other names: DHG, DHG-G34R/V
- Specialty: Neuro-oncology
- Causes: Mutation in the H3F3A gene, Non-inherited
- Treatment: Chemotherapy (Temozolomide), Radiotherapy, Surgery

Diffuse hemispheric glioma, H3G34 mutant (DHG) is a rare, high-grade, infiltrative WHO grade 4 brain tumor most often found in adolescents and young adults. The majority are found in the frontal, parietal, and temporal lobes.

== Diagnosis ==
Prior to 2021, most DHG's fell into the classification of Glioblastoma (GBM). However, modern sequencing techniques have revealed that the molecular alterations driving the cancer are entirely distinct to GBM, leading to changes in the World Health Organization classification system. They are further distinguished from GBM by their radiological presentations, including no or faint contrast enhancement. A diagnosis can only be definitively made with genetic testing of the tumor.

== Treatment ==
Available treatment for DHG will vary depending on the location in the brain that the tumor arises, but typically the first stage of treatment is surgical resection, with the aim of removing as much of the tumor as possible (i.e. gross- or near-total resection). Concomitantly, patients will undergo radiotherapy or proton therapy. Following this, patients will undergo chemotherapy, most commonly with Temozolomide.

== Prognosis ==
Median time to progression is 10 months. After progression, the median time to death is 5 months. Non-pediatric patients and patients with near-or-gross total resection have increased survival duration.

== Pathology ==
Diffuse hemispheric gliomas have a distinct mutation in the histone gene H3F3A.
