= Papillary tumors of the pineal region =

Type of brain tumor

Pineal gland
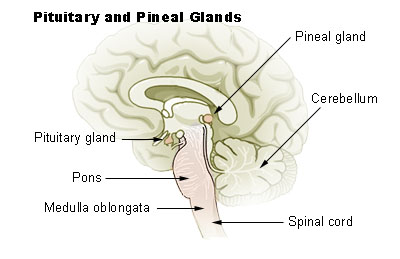
- Diagram of the pineal gland in the human brain. The pineal gland is where the Papillary Tumor is located.

Papillary tumors of the pineal region were first described by A. Jouvet et al. in 2003 and were introduced in the World Health Organization (WHO) classification of central nervous system in 2007. Papillary Tumors of the Pineal Region are located on the pineal gland which is located in the center of the brain. The pineal gland is located on roof of the diencephalon. It is a cone-shaped structure dorsal to the midbrain tectum. The tumor appears to be derived from the specialized ependymal cells of the subcommissural organ. Papillary tumors of the central nervous system and particularly of the pineal region are very rare and so diagnosing them is extremely difficult.

== Symptoms and signs ==
The most common symptom of the papillary tumor is a headache. Because headaches are so common, most people think nothing of it. This is why brain tumors are so dangerous. There are not a lot of symptoms that go along with them so people tend to wait a long time before seeking medical help. Most of the time people will go see a doctor when their headaches become consistent and do not stop. This symptom however occurs secondary to hydrocephalus, which is a result from compression of the cerebral aqueduct. The cerebral aqueduct is a narrow channel in the midbrain, which connects the third and fourth ventricles. When a tumor blocks the pathway of the cerebrospinal fluid, this will cause headaches in the patient. Often when hydrocephalus occurs, a shunt is put in place to alleviate the pressure. In one case study, an endoscopic third ventriculostomy was performed as a first line procedure to treat the hydrocephalus and also for diagnostic purposes.

In some cases, patients have had progressive diplopia, or double vision. Also, although not in all cases, patients sometimes experience nausea and vomiting.

== Pathology ==
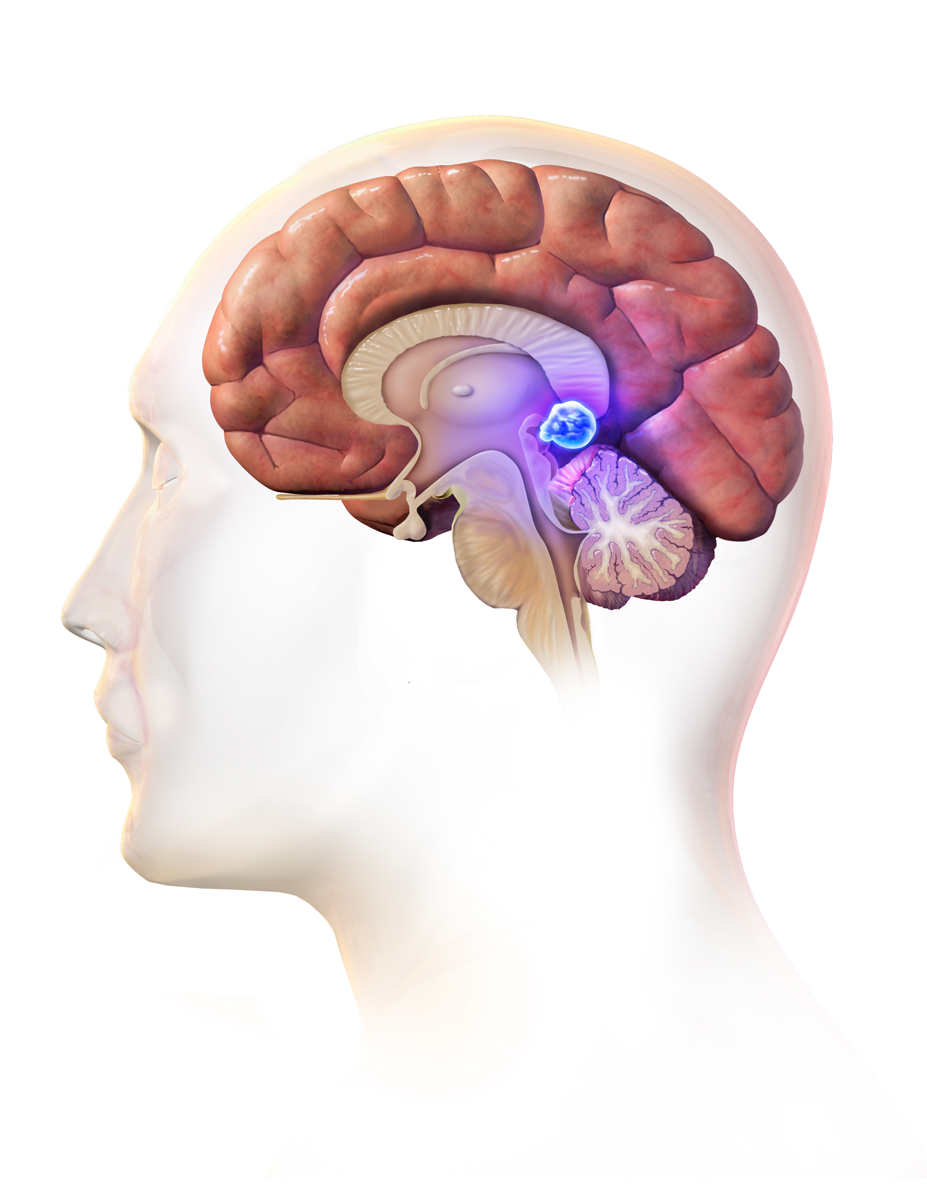
Pineal tumor

Pineal region tumors are normally composed of a variety of cells including astrocytes, ganglion cells, blood vessels, and pinealocytes, which are the cells of this organ. Pinealocytes are specialized neurons, which are rich in monoaminergic neurotransmitters, including, serotonin, norepinephrine, and melatonin. Specifically, papillary tumors of this region are made up of ependymal cells which form papilla. The papilla is meant to be surface cells. The ependymal cells line the inside of the ventricles of the brain. These cells have proteins that make up the characteristics of the tumor. These proteins arise from blood vessels, nerve cells and muscle cells.

These tumors, papillary tumors in this case, have no known predisposing genetic characteristics, as stated by Dr. Janss when I interviewed her. She said that there is nothing that links the likelihood of getting this tumor type to genetics, meaning nothing is inherited. However, technically speaking, there is genetics involved, just not in the sense of inheritability. The tumor cells may differ in their structure and function, but they all have normal function, which is directed by the deoxyribonucleic acid, or DNA. There are meant to be certain cells in a specific area, for the pineal region these are ependymal cells, and the cells divide into millions. As these cells divide, their genetic material is being copied. In a tumor, there is a collection of mutations that are typos in the genetic material, which disrupts the function of the normal cell. Therefore, the cells differentiate from what they were meant to be. If the abnormal cells continue to grow, divide, and produce more abnormal cells, the mass of abnormal cells may eventually become a tumor.

Papillary tumors of the pineal region are normally well circumscribed. They are reported to be fairly large ranging between 2.5 and 4.0 centimeters. These tumors sometimes feature a cystic component.

== Histological and immunohistochemical features ==
The critical diagnosis of this neoplasm is often difficult because of its similarity with other primary or secondary papillary lesions of the pineal region, including parenchymal pineal tumors, papillary ependymoma, papillary meningioma, choroid plexus papilloma, and metastatic papillary carcinoma.

Papillary tumors characteristically show a discrete, compressive border with adjacent pineal gland and brain parenchyma. The nuclei tend to be regular, round-to-oval and contain stippled chromatin. The cytoplasmic and often nuclear expression of S100 protein is present in nearly all tumor cells, and vimentin typically stains tumor cell cytoplasm adjacent to vessel walls. The cells of this tumor usually show a columnar to cuboidal cytoplasm with a well-defined cytoplasmic membrane. Vacuolated, or clear cells are common. Necrosis or cell death is normally observed to some extent in most of these tumors cells.

These tumors were tested immunohistochemically with a profile similar to that of a choroid plexus tumor; however, morphologically the tumors appeared to be less differentiated than a choroid plexus papilloma and more differentiated than a choroid plexus carcinoma.

There is normally cytoplasmic staining for a number of cytokeratins and the immunohistochemical profile for the papillary tumors are as follows:

AE1/AE3 (pan-cytokeratin) → -

CK8/18 (cytokeratin 8/18) → +++

EMA (epithelial membrane antigen) → -

GFAP (glial fibrillary acidic protein) → +

Synaptophysin → -

Chromogranin → -

NSE (neuron-specific enolase) → ++

NFP (neurofilament protein) → -

CD56/N-CAM (neural cell adhesion molecule) → ++

S100 → ++

Transthyretin → -

Vimentin → +++

Desmin → -

SMA (smooth muscle actin) → +

The intensity of immunoreactivity was scored as follows: - (absent), + (weak/focal), ++ (moderate), and +++ (strong).

== Diagnosis ==
=== Grading ===
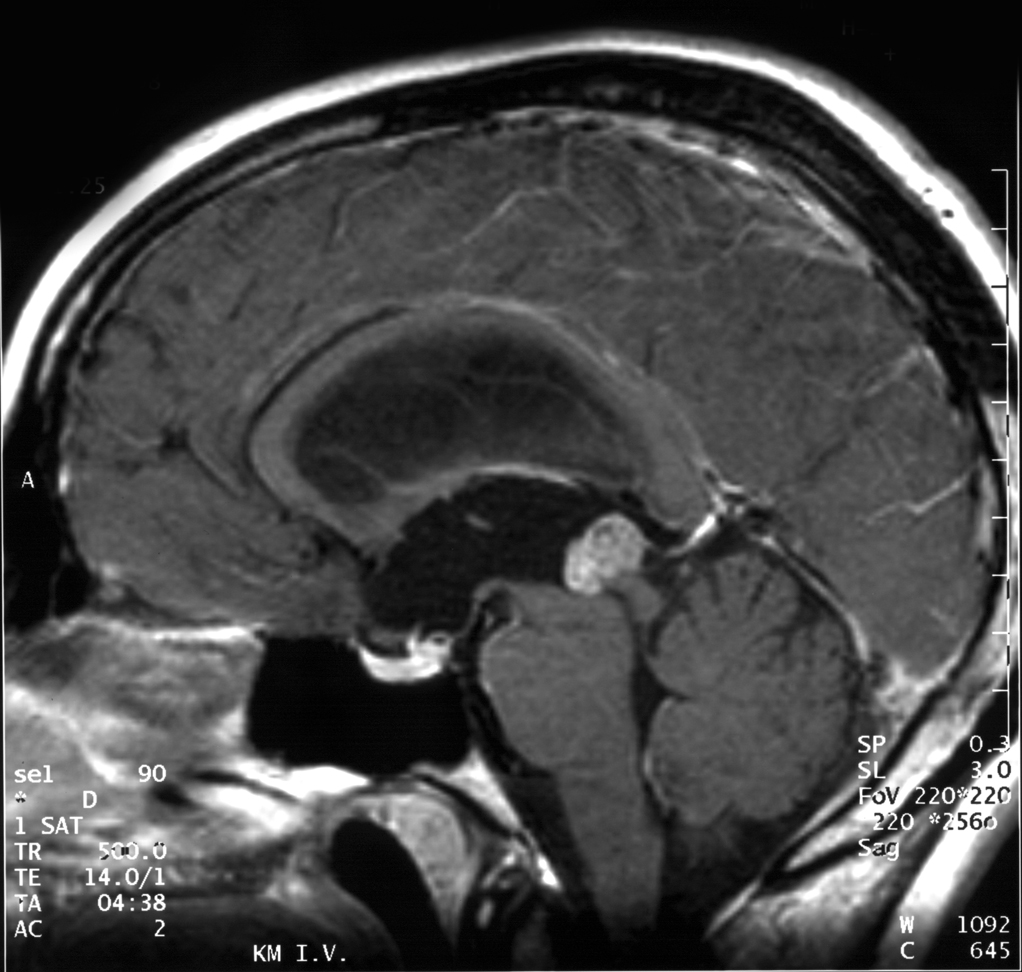
MRI of a papillary tumor of the pineal region in an 18-year-old boy. Sagittal T1+Gd.

Papillary tumor of the pineal region is a recently described neoplasm that has been formally recognized in the 2007 World Health Organization (WHO) "Classification of Tumors of the Nervous System."

Because these tumors are so rare, at first there was really no way to grade these tumors. Once they were biopsied, they were defined as either malignant, meaning cancerous, or benign, meaning cancer free. After seeing more and more cases of this tumor, they are now determined to be either Grade II or Grade III, according to the WHO classification. The mitotic activity varies for these tumors, ranging from 0 to 10 mitoses per 10 high power (x40) fields.

=== Grade II ===
Grade II tumors are relatively slow growing. They have a slightly abnormal microscopic appearance and can spread into nearby normal tissue. Grade II tumors can also recur as a higher-grade tumor.

=== Grade III ===
Grade III tumors are malignant. In these types of tumors the cells are actively reproducing abnormal cells. The cells of the tumor will often grow into nearby normal brain tissue. Grade III tumors tend to recur as higher-grade tumors.

== Epidemiology ==
Papillary tumors of pineal region are extremely rare, constituting 0.4–1% of all central nervous system tumors. These tumors most commonly occur in adults with the mean age being 31.5. There have been cases reported for people between the ages of 5 and 66 years. There is a slight predominance of females who have these tumors.

== Current research ==
Because of the rarity of these tumors, there is still a lot of unknown information. There are many case studies that have been reported on patients who have been diagnosed with this specific type of tumor. Most of the above information comes from the findings resulting from case studies.

Since Papillary Tumors of the Pineal Region were first described in 2003, there have been seventy cases published in the English literature. Since there is such a small number of cases that have been reported, the treatment guidelines have not been established. A larger number of cases that contain a longer clinical follow-up are needed to optimize the management of patients with this rare disease.

Even though there is a general consensus on the morphology and the immunohistochemical characteristics that is required for the diagnosis, the histological grading criteria have yet to be fully defined and its biological behavior appears to be variable. This specific type of tumor appears to have a high potential for local recurrence with a high tumor bed recurrence rate during the five years after the initial surgery. This suggests the need for a tumor bed boost radiotherapy after surgical resection.

As stated above, the specific treatment guidelines have not yet been established, however, gross total resection of the tumor has been the only clinical factor associated overall and progression-free survival. The value of radiotherapy as well as chemotherapy on disease progression will need to be investigated in future trials. With this information, it will provide important insight into long-term management and may further our understanding of the histologic features of this tumor.

== See also ==
- Pineal gland
