= Central neurocytoma =

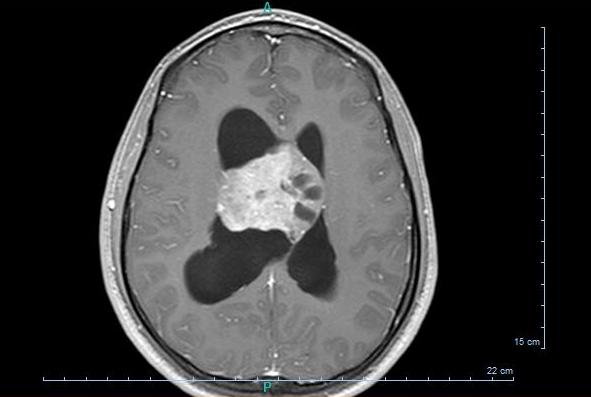
- Axial T1-weighted gadolinium-enhanced MRI image showing an enhancing mass with cystic changes consistent with central neurocytoma in the right lateral ventricle.
- Specialty: Oncology, neurosurgery

Central neurocytoma (CNC) is an extremely rare, ordinarily benign intraventricular brain tumour that typically forms from the neuronal cells of the septum pellucidum. The majority of central neurocytomas grow inwards into the ventricular system forming interventricular neurocytomas. This leads to two primary symptoms of CNCs, blurred vision and increased intracranial pressure. Treatment for a central neurocytoma typically involves surgical removal, with an approximate 1 in 5 chance of recurrence. Central neurocytomas are classified as a grade II tumor under the World Health Organization's classification of tumors of the nervous system.

== Signs and symptoms ==
There is a wide range of symptoms that patients show. Symptoms can lie dormant, but come about due to Obstructive hydrocephalus. These symptoms include:

- Intracranial pressure
- Headache
- Papilledema
- Vomiting
- Light headedness
- Impaired mental activity
- Gait instability

In rare and extreme cases, more severe symptoms can be observed:

- Memory disturbance
- Dementia
- Hemiparesis
- Seizures
- Hemorrhage
- Psychosis

== Pathology ==
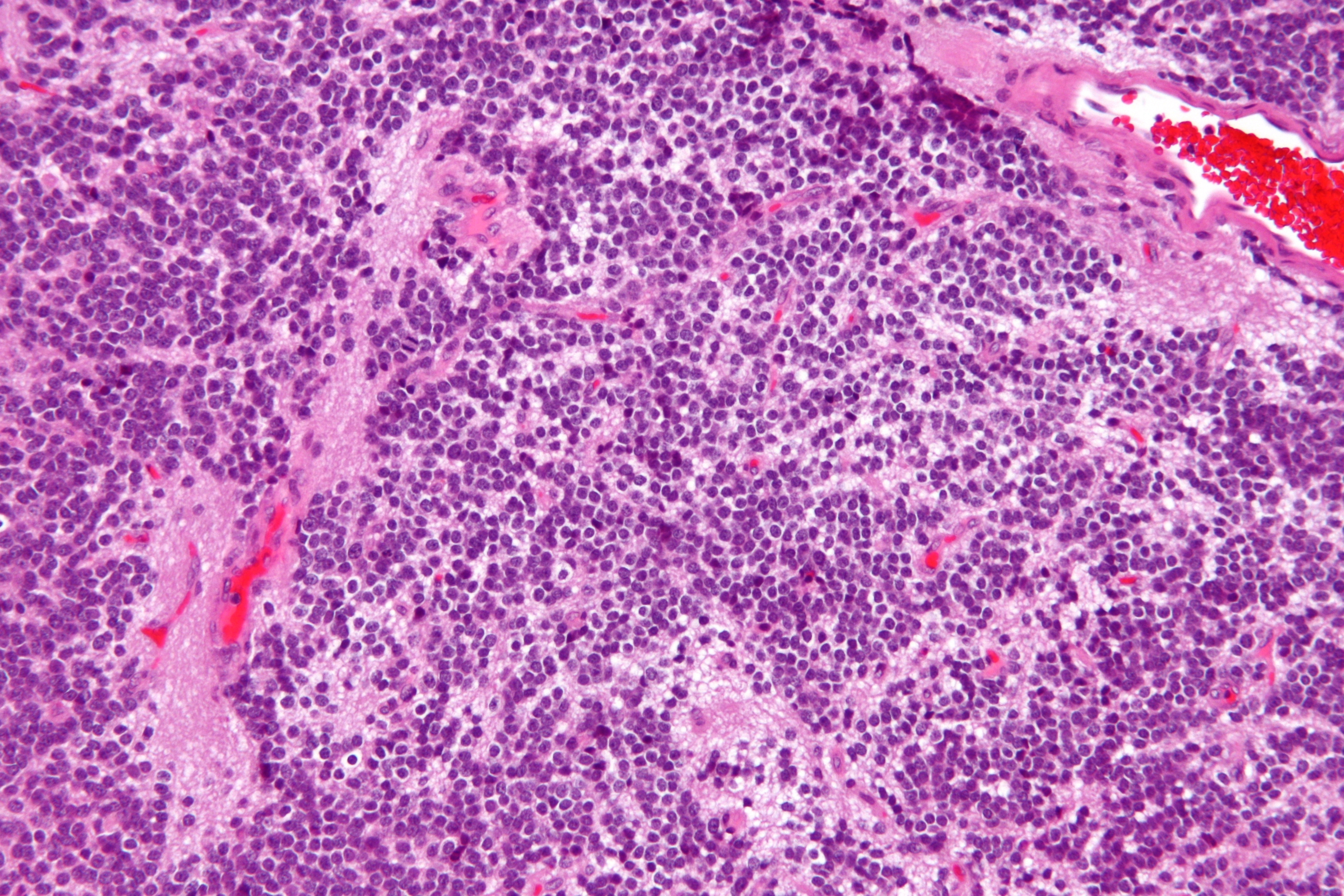
Micrograph of a central neurocytoma. H&E stain.

On the macroscopic scale, CNC tumors are grayish in color, resembling the gray matter that comes with areas of hemorrhage. The tumors are soft, ovid, lobulated to nodular masses that are generally well circumscribed. When dissecting the tumor, scientists experienced some grittiness, which they attribute to the presence of calcification.

Tumor samples stained using H&E stain and examined under the microscope revealed that CNC is a well-differentiated tumor with benign histological features. The tumor is composed of “uniform, small-to-medium-sized cells with rounded nuclei, finely stippled chromatin and inconspicuous nucleoli, along with scant cytoplasm.” CNC are characterized by perivascular pseudorosettes, circular/flower-like arrangements of cells with a small blood vessel at the centre, and polygonal small cells with a clear perinuclear halo, sometimes called the ‘fried egg’ appearance, and is clear or slightly eosinophilic. The main histomorphologic differential diagnosis is oligodendroglioma. While the tumor cells are dense in some areas, areas with anuclear, less dense tumor parts were dispersed throughout. The anuclear areas may have a fine fibrillary matrix, like that of neuropil regions. Long, thin-walled, capillary-sized vessels represent the vascularity of CNC. These vessels are arranged in a linear branching pattern, with an endocrine appearance. Thin-walled dilated vascular channels, as well as foci of calcification, were readily identified in many cases.

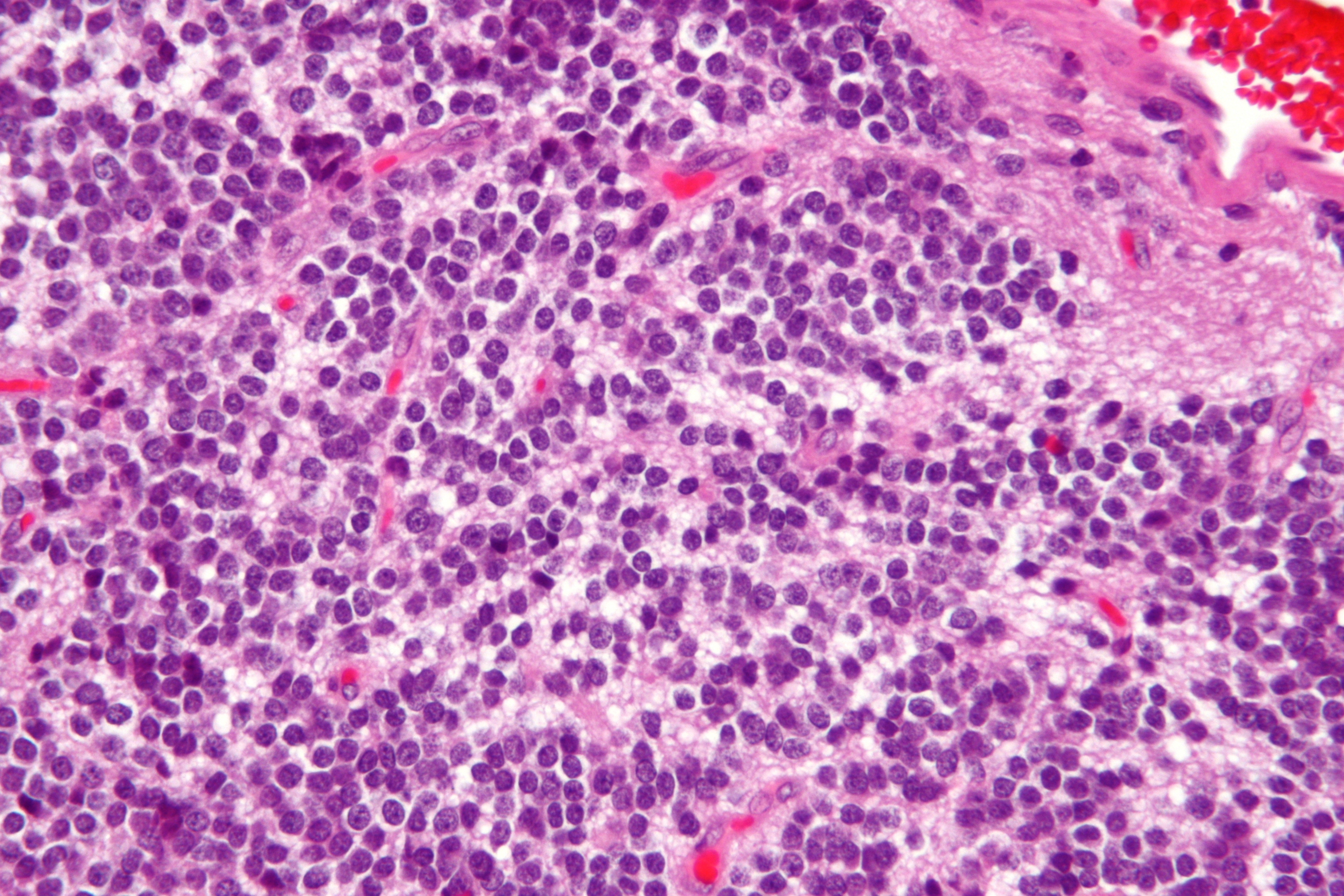
Very high mag.

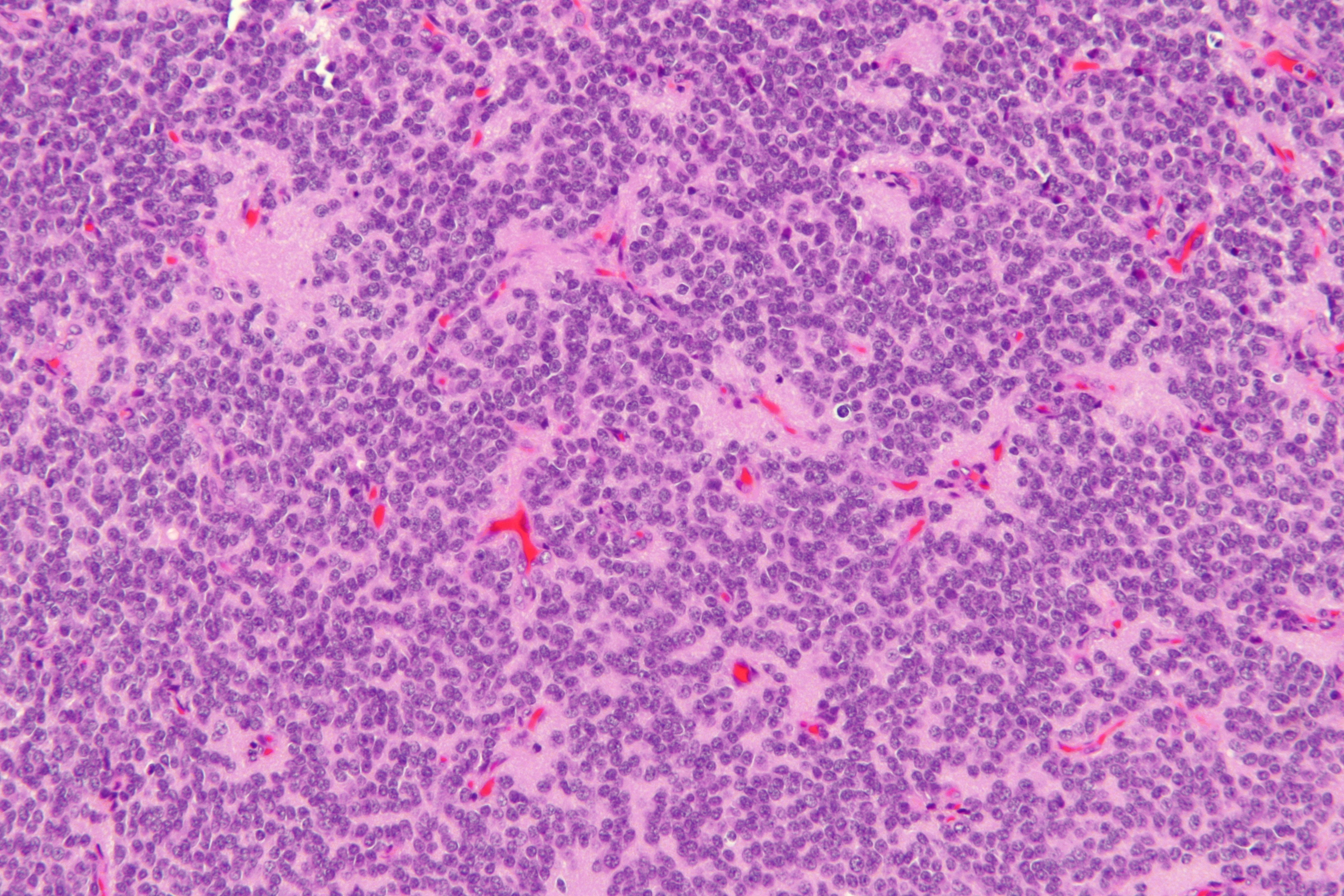
High mag.

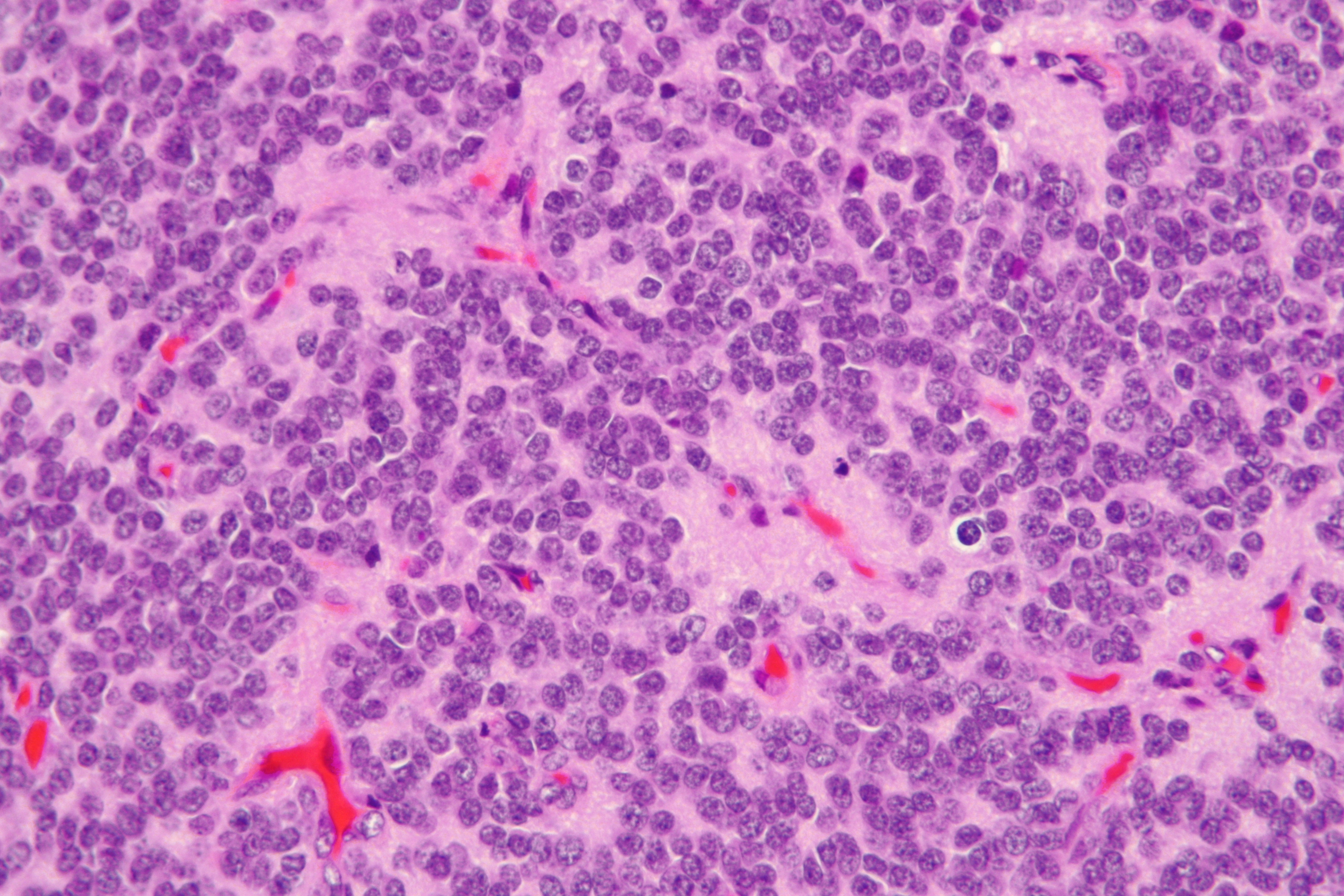
Very high mag.

== Treatment ==
The mainstay of treatment is surgical excision. Two adjuvant therapeutic strategies are Stereotactic surgery (SRS) and fractionated convention radiotherapy (FCRT). Both are highly effective means of treatment.

=== Surgery ===
Surgical excision of the central neurocytoma is the primary consensus among practicing physicians. The surgeons perform a craniotomy to remove the tumor. The ability to remove the tumor and to what extent it is removed is dependent upon the location of the tumor and surgeon experience and preference. The extent of the disease plays a large part in determining how effective the surgery will be. The main goal of a complete surgical resection, of the tumor, can also be hindered by the adherence of the tumor to adjoining structures or hemorrhages. If there is a recurrence of the central neurocytoma, surgery is again the most notable treatment.

=== Radiotherapy ===
There is not much evidence supporting the claim that radiotherapy is a beneficial and effective means of treatment. Typically, radiotherapy is used postoperatively in respect to whether or not a partial or complete excision of the tumor has been accomplished. The histopathological features of CNC, neuronal differentiation, low mitotic activity, absence of vascular endothelial proliferation, and tumor necrosis, suggest that the tumor may be resistant to ionizing radiation. However, when radiotherapy is used, whole brain or involved-field treatment is given. This method utilizes a standard fractionation schedule and a total tumor dose of 50-55 Gy. Gamma knife surgery is a form of radiotherapy, more specifically radiosurgery that uses beams of gamma rays to deliver a certain dosage of radiation to the tumor. Gamma knife surgery is incredibly effective at treating neurocytoma and maintaining tumor control after the procedure when a complete excision has been performed. Some studies have found that the success rate of tumor control is around 90% after the first five years and 80% after the first ten years. Gamma knife surgery is the most recorded form of radiotherapy performed to treat remnants of the CNC tumor after surgery.

=== Chemotherapy ===
Chemotherapy is typically limited to patients with recurrent central neurocytoma. The course of chemotherapy used for CNC is one of two platinum-based regimes. The two regimes are:

- Carboplatin + VP-16 + ifosfamide
- cisplatin + VP-16 + cyclophosphamide

Because chemotherapy is used in rare cases there is still information to be gathered as to the efficacy of chemotherapy to treat benign CNC. Therefore, recommendations must be viewed as limited and preliminary.

=== Outcome and recurrence ===
The majority of patients can be expected to be cured of their disease and become long-term survivors of central neurocytoma. As with any other type of tumor, there is a chance for recurrence. The chance of recurrence is approximately 20%. Some factors that predict tumor recurrence and death due to progressive states of disease are high proliferative indices, early disease recurrence, and disseminated disease with or without the spread of disease through the cerebral spinal fluid. Long-term follow up examinations are essential for the evaluation of the outcomes that each treatment brings about. It is also essential to identify possible recurrence of CN. It is recommended that a cranial MRI is performed between every 6–12 months.

== History ==
It was first described in 1982 by Hassoun. Central neurocytomas are rare brain tumors that are located most of the times in the lateral ventricles near the Monro foramina. They were first discovered by Hassoun and co-workers in 1982, and were classified as grade II tumors. In 1985, Wilson had also described a rare case of "differentiated neuroblastoma" in the lateral ventricle that resembles oligodendroglioma on light microscopy. However, the name central neurocytoma was given by Hassoun.

Primary neuronal tumors occurring in the ventricular system were considered to be rare. Most cases described were of non-neuronal origin such as oligodendroglioma, ependymoma, meningioma, choroid plexus papilloma and giant cell. Neurocytomas were probably historically misdiagnosed as intraventricular oligondedronglioma or clear cell ependymoma prior to this. With its non-aggressive behavior the tumor has often been called "benign central neurocytoma". It is believed to occur in young adults from the neuronal cells of the septum pullicidum and the subependymal cells of the lateral ventricles. Most of the initial incidents reported in the lateral ventricle were benign. However, as more information was gathered the name benign central neurocytoma was started to be seen as a double misnomer because these tumors are not always benign nor centrally located. Many recent studies suggest that their location, biological potential and clinical behavior are observed be more variable than previously thought. Recent studies indicate their uncommon location, aggressive biological behavior and frequent recurrences following after surgical resection have generated significant interest in various treatment modalities and also in their terminology, lineage potential and molecular regulation.

== Epidemiology ==
CNC represent 0.1-0.5% of primary brain tumours. There is a genetic component to the formation of these tumors, causing a larger proportion of tumors to form in people of Asian descent than of other ethnic groups. Central neurocytomas predominantly form in young adults, most commonly during the second or third decade of life. There is no evidence that the sex of a person is a determinant in the frequency of central neurocytomas.
