= Synaptophysin =

Protein-coding gene in the species Homo sapiens

SYP

Identifiers
- Aliases: SYP, MRX96, MRXsynaptophysin, XLID96
- External IDs: OMIM: 313475; MGI: 98467; GeneCards: SYP

Gene location (Human)
Chr.	X chromosome (human)
Band	Xp11.23	Start	49,187,815 bp
Band	Xp11.23	End	49,200,218 bp

Gene location (Mouse)
Chr.	X chromosome (mouse)
Band	X A1.1|X 3.44 cM	Start	7,504,710 bp
Band	X A1.1|X 3.44 cM	End	7,519,495 bp
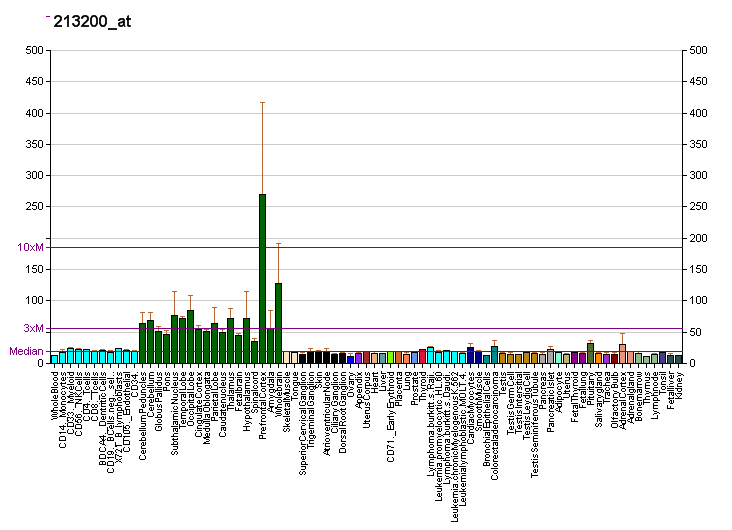
RNA expression pattern
Bgee	Human / Mouse (ortholog); Top expressed in: right hemisphere of cerebellum; right frontal lobe; prefrontal cortex; Brodmann area 9; anterior cingulate cortex; amygdala; anterior pituitary; Brodmann area 10; nucleus accumbens; C1 segment / Top expressed in: neural layer of retina; dentate gyrus of hippocampal formation granule cell; medial dorsal nucleus; superior frontal gyrus; subiculum; cerebellar cortex; medial geniculate nucleus; dorsomedial hypothalamic nucleus; medial vestibular nucleus; habenula; More reference expression data
BioGPS	More reference expression data
Gene ontology
Molecular function	SH2 domain binding; protein self-association; cholesterol binding; identical protein binding; syntaxin-1 binding
Cellular component	integral component of membrane; membrane; synaptic vesicle; synapse; excitatory synapse; synaptic vesicle membrane; presynaptic active zone; cell junction; terminal bouton; integral component of synaptic vesicle membrane; neuron projection; neuron projection terminus; presynaptic membrane; cytoplasmic vesicle; neuromuscular junction; Schaffer collateral - CA1 synapse; perinuclear region of cytoplasm
Biological process	cellular response to organic substance; regulation of long-term neuronal synaptic plasticity; endocytosis; regulation of opioid receptor signaling pathway; regulation of short-term neuronal synaptic plasticity; synaptic vesicle membrane organization; regulation of neuronal synaptic plasticity; synaptic vesicle maturation; synaptic vesicle endocytosis; regulation of synaptic vesicle exocytosis
Sources:Amigo / QuickGO
Orthologs
Databases	NCBI: entry; OMA: entry
Species	Human	Mouse
Entrez	6855	20977
Ensembl	ENSG00000102003	ENSMUSG00000031144
UniProt	P08247	Q62277
RefSeq (mRNA)	NM_003179	NM_009305
RefSeq (protein)	NP_003170	NP_033331
Location (UCSC)	Chr X: 49.19 – 49.2 Mb	Chr X: 7.5 – 7.52 Mb
PubMed search
- Wikidata
View/Edit Human	View/Edit Mouse

Synaptophysin, also known as the major synaptic vesicle protein p38, is a protein that in humans is encoded by the SYP gene.

== Gene ==
The gene is located on the short arm of X chromosome (Xp11.23-p11.22). It is 12,406 bases in length and lies on the minus strand.

== Tissue distribution ==
It is expressed in neuroendocrine cells and in virtually all neurons in the brain and spinal cord that participate in synaptic transmission.

== Structure ==
The protein is a synaptic vesicle glycoprotein with four transmembrane domains weighing 38 kDa.

== Function ==
The exact function of the protein is unknown: it interacts with the essential synaptic vesicle protein synaptobrevin, but when the synaptophysin gene is experimentally inactivated in animals, they still develop and function normally. Recent research has shown, however, that elimination of synaptophysin in mice creates behavioral changes such as increased exploratory behavior, impaired object novelty recognition, and reduced spatial learning.

== Clinical significance ==
=== Biomarker ===
It acts as a marker for neuroendocrine tumors, and its ubiquity at the synapse has led to the use of synaptophysin immunostaining for quantification of synapses.

Using immunohistochemistry, synaptophysin can be demonstrated in a range of neural and neuroendocrine tissues, including cells of the adrenal medulla and pancreatic islets. As a specific marker for these tissues, it can be used to identify tumours arising from them, such as neuroblastoma, retinoblastoma, phaeochromocytoma, carcinoid, small-cell carcinoma, medulloblastoma and medullary thyroid carcinoma, among others. Diagnostically, it is often used in combination with chromogranin A.

=== X-linked intellectual disability ===
Mutations in this gene have been implicated in X-linked intellectual disability.

== Interactions ==
Synaptophysin has been shown to interact with AP1G1 and SIAH2.

== See also ==
- List of human genes
- Merkel-cell carcinoma - although origin of this tumor is unclear, it does express synaptophysin
