= Cisternography =

- Purpose: determine if there is abnormal CSF flow within the brain and spinal cord

Cisternography is a medical imaging technique to examine the flow of cerebrospinal fluid (CSF) in the brain, and spinal cord. The gold standard for diagnosis of a cranial cerebrospinal fluid leak is CT cisternography. For the diagnosis of a spinal CSF leak radionuclide cisternography also known as radioisotope cisternography is used. The false negative rate of cisternography is high (30%), so the radiographic study of choice is CT myelography. The third type of cisternography is MR cisternography.

== Types ==
=== Radionuclide ===
Radionuclide cisternography may be used to diagnose a spinal cerebrospinal fluid leak. CSF pressure is measured and imaged over 24 hours. A radionuclide (radioisotope) is injected by lumbar puncture (spinal tap) into the cerebral spinal fluid to determine if there is abnormal CSF flow within the brain and spinal canal which can be altered by hydrocephalus, Arnold–Chiari malformation, syringomyelia, or an arachnoid cyst. It may also evaluate a suspected CSF leak (also known as a CSF fistula) from the CSF cavity into the nasal cavity. A leak can also be confirmed by the presence of beta-2 transferrin in fluid collected from the nose before this more invasive procedure is performed.

The spinal fluid is injected with a radiopharmaceutical tracer, such as DTPA tagged with indium 111, through a lumbar puncture. The tracer will diffuse up the spinal column and into the intracranial ventricles and the subarachnoid spaces around the brain. The progress of the tracer's diffusion through the CSF will be recorded by a nuclear medicine gamma camera. Images are usually taken immediately, at 6 hours, and at 24 hours, and may also be taken at follow-up scans at 48 hours and 72 hours.

Headaches following the procedure are common, but should fade in 3–5 days. Drinking caffeinated liquids, as well as bed rest, is often recommended, though at least one scientific paper disputes the practice.

=== Computed tomography ===
Computed tomography (CT) cisternography is a CT scan with the use of a contrast agent to show up CSF leakages that may occur anywhere in the skull base.
