= Cerebrospinal fluid rhinorrhoea =

- Specialty: Neurology, neurosurgery, otorhinolaryngology, Oral and maxillofacial surgery
- Symptoms: clear, colourless liquid draining from nose
- Complications: infection
- Causes: basilar skull fracture
- Diagnostic method: brain scans, testing nasal discharge to see if it is CSF
- Differential diagnosis: other types of rhinorrhoea
- Treatment: conservative management: observation neurosurgery: repairing any skull fracture

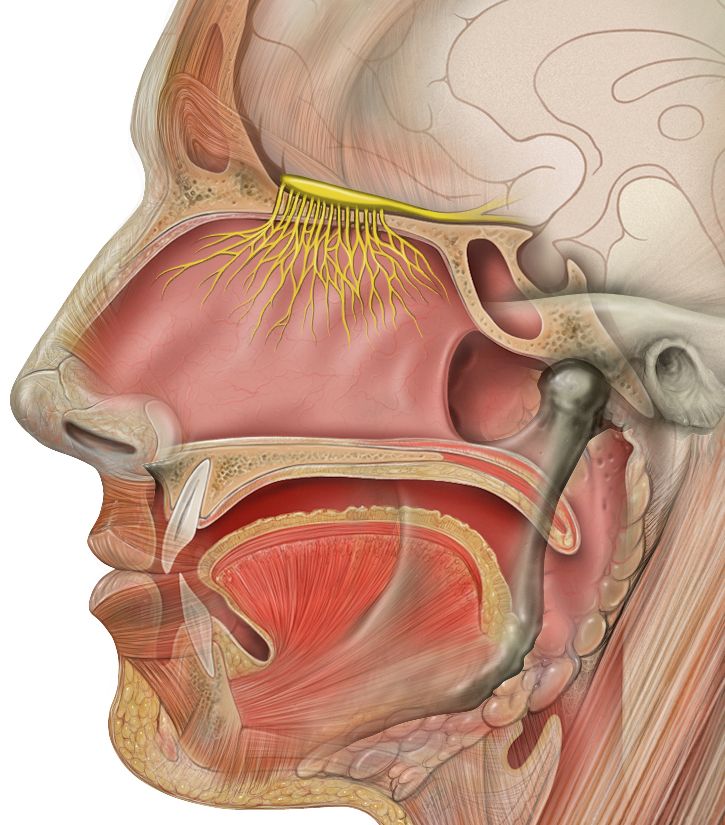

Cerebrospinal fluid rhinorrhoea (CSF rhinorrhoea) refers to the drainage of cerebrospinal fluid through the nose (rhinorrhoea). It is typically caused by a basilar skull fracture, which presents complications such as infection. It may be diagnosed using brain scans (prompted based on initial symptoms), and by testing to see if discharge from the nose is cerebrospinal fluid. Treatment may be conservative (as many cases resolve spontaneously), but usually involves neurosurgery.

== Classification ==
CSF rhinorrhoea may be spontaneous, traumatic, or congenital.

Traumatic CSF rhinorrhoea is the most common type of CSF rhinorrhoea. It may be due to severe head injury, or from complications from neurosurgery.

Spontaneous CSF rhinorrhoea is the most common acquired defect in the skull base bones (anterior cranial fossa) causing spontaneous nasal liquorrhea. Defects are often localized in the sphenoid bone and the ethmoid bone.

Congenital CSF rhinorrhoea is the least common type of CSF rhinorrhoea. It may be caused by problems in the embryological development of bones of the skull.

== Signs and symptoms ==
CSF rhinorrhoea involves drainage of cerebrospinal fluid through the nose. This appears as a clear, colourless liquid.

== Causes ==
=== Traumatic ===
CSF rhinorrhoea may be a sign of a basilar skull fracture. Other signs of a basilar skull fracture include CSF otorrhea (drainage of CSF through the ear). It can have devastating complications in some patients, as the communication between the nasal cavity, the cerebrospinal fluid and the central nervous system can result in severe bacterial infections.

CSF rhinorrhoea may be a complication of neurosurgery, such as functional endoscopic sinus surgery, and hypophysectomy (partial or complete removal of the pituitary gland).

=== Non-traumatic ===
CSF rhinorrhoea may be caused by the growth of certain tumours (such as pituitary adenoma), raised intracranial pressure, congenital problems with bones of the skull, or inflammation that damages the bones of the skull.

== Diagnosis ==
=== Radiology ===
If a patient has clear, colourless liquid leaking from the nose, then radiographs or CT scans may be used to look for a basilar skull fracture.

=== Biochemistry ===
Measures of CSF components, such as glucose, have been used in the past, but are neither sensitive nor specific. Beta-2 transferrin has a high positive predictive value of CSF rhinorrhoea. It has also been noted to be characterized by unilateral discharge.

== Treatment ==
=== Surgery ===
Neurosurgery is usually necessary to prevent the spread of infection to the meninges. Minimally invasive techniques tend to have fewer complications compared to open techniques.

=== Conservative management ===
Conservative management includes watchful waiting, as some minor CSF leaks often stop spontaneously.

== See also ==
- Beta-2 transferrin
- Meningitis
- Traumatic head injury
