= Epidural blood patch =

Blood injected epidurally to resolve a cerebrospinal fluid leak

- Diagram of an epidural blood patch
- ICD-10-PCS: G97.1
- MeSH: D017217

An epidural blood patch (EBP) is a surgical procedure that uses autologous blood, meaning the patient's own blood, in order to close one or many holes in the dura mater of the spinal cord, which occurred as a complication of a lumbar puncture or epidural placement. The punctured dura causes cerebrospinal fluid leak (CSF leak). The procedure can be used to relieve orthostatic headaches, most commonly post dural puncture headache (PDPH).

This procedure carries the typical risks of any epidural procedure. EBP are usually administered near the site of the cerebrospinal fluid leak (CSF leak), but in some cases the upper part of the spine is targeted. An epidural needle is inserted into the epidural space like a traditional epidural procedure. The blood modulates the pressure of the CSF and forms a clot, sealing the leak. EBPs were first described by American anesthesiologist Turan Ozdil and surgeon James B Gormley around 1960.

EBPs are an invasive procedure but are safe and effective—further intervention is sometimes necessary, and repeat patches can be administered until symptoms resolve. It is considered the gold standard treatment for PDPH. Common side effects include back pain and headache. Rebound intracranial hypertension in people with spontaneous intracranial hypotension (SIH) is common, and people with SIH may have less success with EBPs. While the procedure uses blood, it does not carry a significant infectious risk, even in immunocompromised people. The procedure is not entirely benign—seven cases of arachnoiditis have been reported as a result of administration.

== Uses ==
EBPs are administered for treatment-related or spontaneous orthostatic headaches. The procedure is most often used to relieve PDPH following an epidural injection or lumbar puncture.

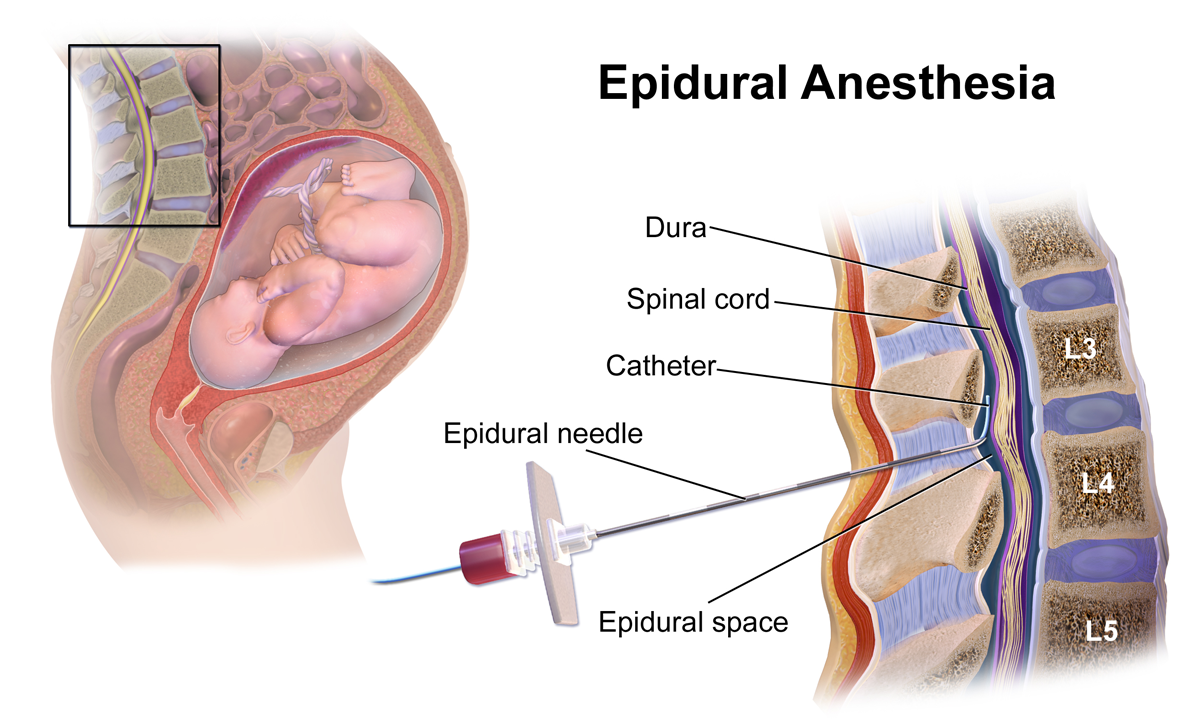
Diagram of epidural catheter placement.

Post dural puncture headache (PDPH) is a side of effect of spinal anesthesia, where the clinician accidentally punctures the dura with the spinal needle and causes leakage of CSF. Factors such as pregnancy, having a low body mass index, being a female and young, increase the risk of dural puncture. The most common population at risk are pregnant patients, as they are usually young females, who commonly undergo epidural placements for pain control. It is estimated that the likelihood of a dural puncture occurring as a result of epidural catheter placement is 1.5%, with PDPH occurring in as much as 50% of these cases.

Dural punctures usually present with a headache or backache within 3 days of the procedure. The headache causes pain over the forehead and the back of the head. A distinguishing feature between PDPH and other types of headaches is the exacerbation of the headache with standing, and is non-throbbing like the common tension headaches. As a result, many clinicians advise patients to lay flat and hydrate well to minimize the risk, but the efficacy of this practice has been questioned.

Most PDPHs are self-limiting, so epidural blood patches are only used for people with moderate to severe cases who do not respond to conservative treatment. In these patients, the headache is usually so severe that it affects the patient's ability to carry out normal daily tasks, and in cases of postpartum women, the concern is they are unable to care for themselves or their newborns.

EBP is also used to treat spontaneous intracranial hypotension (SIH). EBP has been used to treat pseudomeningoceles and leaks around intrathecal pumps. For SIH, the same administration technique is used but at a different location with a different amount of blood injected.

== Technique ==
=== Anatomy ===
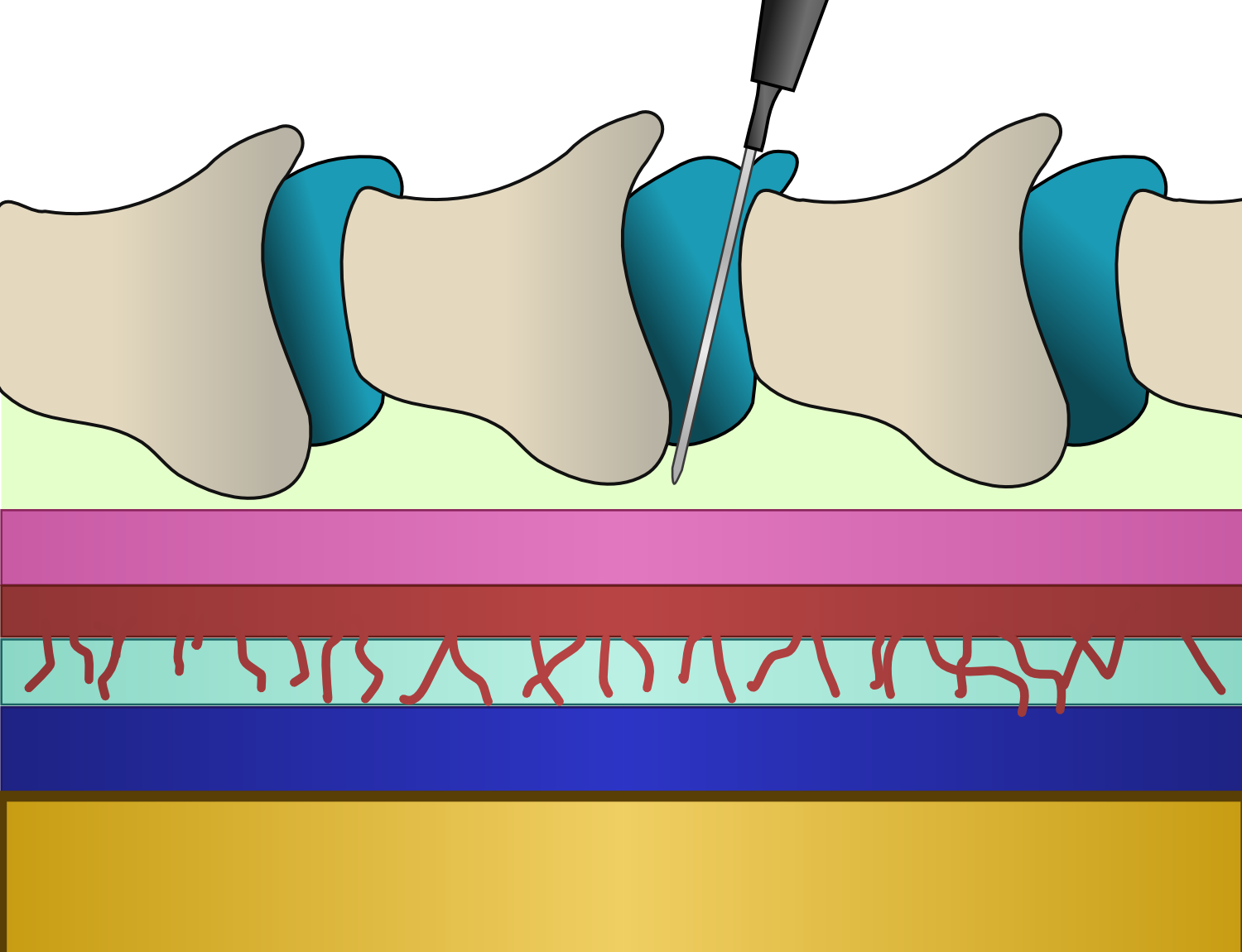
Sagittal section of the spinal column (not drawn to scale). Yellow: spinal cord; blue: pia mater; light blue: subarachnoid space; red: arachnoid; pink: dura mater; pale green: epidural space; taupe: vertebral bones; teal: interspinous ligaments.

An epidural is injected into the epidural space, inside the bony spinal canal but just outside the dura. In contact with the inner surface of the dura is another membrane called the arachnoid mater, which contains the cerebrospinal fluid. In adults, the spinal cord terminates around the level of the disc between L1 and L2, while in neonates it extends to L3 but can reach as low as L4. Below the spinal cord there is a bundle of nerves known as the cauda equina or "horse's tail". Hence, lumbar epidural injections carry a low risk of injuring the spinal cord. Insertion of an epidural needle involves threading a needle between the bones, through the ligaments and into the epidural space without puncturing the layer immediately below containing CSF under pressure. For administration of an EBP due to PDPH, the level of prior epidural puncture is targeted; blood injected for the most part spreads cranially. For SIH with unidentified leakage spots, L2 and L3 are targeted initially.

=== Insertion ===
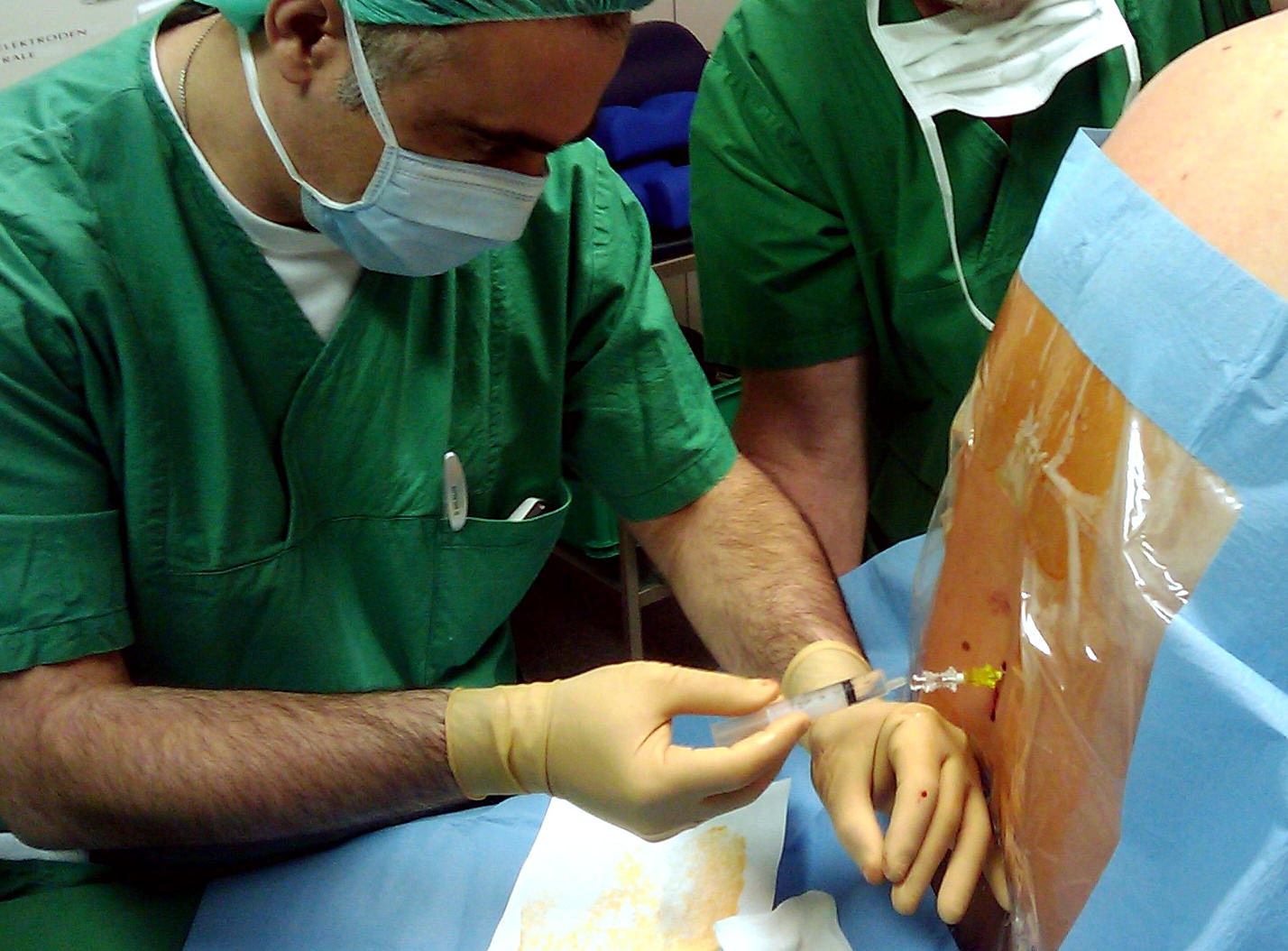
Epidural needle insertion

For EBPs, autologous blood is drawn from a peripheral vein; the procedure uses a typical epidural needle. 20 mL of blood is recommended for EBPs, though injection should stop if not tolerated by the patient. This amount of blood is also recommended for people in obstetrics. Targeted EBP is performed under real-time fluoroscopy if the location of the CSF leak is known. This fluoroscopic approach is standard, but with cases of SIH two-site blind injection has similar outcomes. No randomized clinical trials have been conducted for this due to the rarity of SIH. CT scanning can also be used. Blood from EBPs is spread throughout several segments within the epidural space, so it does not need to be injected at the same level as the puncture. For treatment of SIH, medication with acetazolamide before an EBP and administration in the Trendelenburg position is effective.

=== Mechanism ===
When an EBP is administered a mass effect occurs which compresses the subarachnoid space, thereby increasing and modulating the pressure of the CSF, which translates intracranially. Blood maintains a pressures surge for a longer time than crystalloid fluids. Simultaneously, an "epidural plug" is formed as a result of clot formation; the clot adheres to the thecal sac, potentially becoming a permanent plug. After about half a day the mass effect stops, and a mature clot is left.

== Contraindications ==
Epidural blood patches are contraindicated in people with bleeding disorders, infection at the puncture site, fever, and bloodstream infections or sepsis. Some clinicians recommend obtaining blood cultures before administration of EBP to ensure the absence of infections. EBP may be contraindicated in people with a spinal deformity, HIV/AIDS, and leukemia. Epidurals are recommended for perioperative COVID-19 patients over general anesthesia—EBPs have an extremely low risk of transferring an infection to the central nervous system even with an ongoing infection but are a last resort after conservative treatments and nerve blocks. Though little large-scale clinical studies have been conducted, and no adverse effects have been reported thus far, EBP are a relative contraindication in patients with malignancies.

== Risks/Complications ==
Common side effects are headache, back pain, neck pain, and mild fever. Back pain is reported in approximately 80% of people, which might be a result of increased pressure. Radicular pain may also occur. Rebound intracranial hypotension is very common in people with SIH after an EBP, and can be treated with acetazolamide, topiramate, or in severe cases therapeutic lumbar puncture; most cases are not severe. Rare side effects include subdural or spinal bleeding, infection, and seizure, though EBPs do not carry a significant infectious risk even in immunocompromised people. Neurological symptoms occasionally develop as a result of administration. Seven cases of arachnoiditis have been documented. As a result of the procedure, additional dural puncture can occur, which may increase the chance of inadvertently injecting blood intrathecally.

== Effectiveness ==
EBPs are invasive but are highly effective with a 50-80% success rate, and are relatively low risk, except the risks associated with epidural administration. Waiting 24 hours before administration reduces the failure rate of it significantly, though performing it within 48 hours after puncture is associated with a higher need for repeat patches. Successful treatment of PDPH with EBP has been reported months after onset. Success rates may be higher than 96% with repeated EBP, even in the pediatric population. EBPs are more likely to be successful with more than 22.5 mL of blood injected, and in people with less severe spinal CSF leakage. In people with severe leakage, treatment outcome does not depend on the amount of blood injected. An ineffective EBP is more likely to occur in people with SIH where the CSF leak was not identified and a repeat EBP may be necessary. Nerve compression can also occur which can result in transient neurologic damage; less frequently, this may be permanent. Some people may benefit from fibrin glue mixed with the blood. EBP may cause more side effects than a topical nerve block of the sphenopalatine neuron cell group in postpartum women though no large-scale clinical trials have been conducted. Multiple EBPs can be administered as necessary; this is more likely to happen with people with spontaneous headache or multiple leakages. About 20% of people need a second EBP, and up to 20% of women do not have their symptoms resolved.

Studies have shown that Prophylactic EBPs do not decrease the risk of getting PDPH. The use of EBPs as a treatment for PDPH, although historically considered aggressive, is increasing in adolescents as they are less likely to have their headaches resolved by conservative treatment. Fluoroscopic EBPs are more successful than blindly administered ones as it allows for real-time visualization. The failure rate is around 15-20%, though this can get as high as 30%.

== History ==
The treatment of PDPH was historically uncertain—49 recommendations existed for the treatment of it. It was originally thought to be more of a psychogenic disease, which may have delayed the development of EBPs. Turan Ozdil, an anesthesiology instructor at the University of Tennessee, hypothesized how clotted blood could plug a hole in the dura while observing a car tire repair. He worked with his associate W. Forrest Powell, leading to trials on dog models and then on humans around 1960. James B. Gormley, a general surgeon, first observed how bloody lumbar punctures led to reduced rates of PDPH also in 1960; Gormley would use only 2 to 3 mL of blood for experimenting with EBP, and he was not trained in epidural administration. Ozdil was unaware of Gormley's work, and Ozdil designed his technique to be prophylactic. Anesthesiologist Anthony DiGiovanni refined Ozdil and Powell's technique, using 10 mL of blood to treat a person with unknown leakage locations. DiGiovanni's staff member Burdett Dunbar wanted to more widely disseminate their technique, though their study was initially rejected by Anesthesiology until publication in Anesthesia & Analgesia in 1970. Detractors such as Charles Bagley at Johns Hopkins University provided evidence against the treatment since 1928 as according to their studies blood in the CSF had significant side effects up to "severe convulsive seizures"; DiGiovanni disproved this in 1972. J. Selwyn Crawford discovered in 1980 that using a larger volume of blood was more successful. The procedure would be widely accepted at the end of the 1970s.
