= Sarah Teelow =

Australian water skier

- Born: Sarah Louise Teelow; 22 January 1993; Wellington, New South Wales, Australia
- Died: 24 November 2013 (aged 20); Sydney, New South Wales, Australia
- Occupation: Water skier
- Years active: 2007–2013

Sarah Louise Teelow (22 January 1993 – 24 November 2013) was an Australian water skier. The daughter of parents who were water skiers and who operate a swimming pool business, she competed in the sport from the age of 13. Teelow entered events across the globe and won the 2013 Waterski Racing World Championship in the Formula 2 category. Teelow was killed from an atlanto-occipital dislocation she sustained in an accident during the 2013 Bridge to Bridge Water Ski Classic.

== Personal life ==
Teelow was born in the Wellington Hospital in Wellington, New South Wales on 22 January 1993 to Tania (née Williams) and Chris Teelow; both of her parents competed in water skiing events and her mother is a two-time world champion. The family operates a swimming pool business in Wellington and reside in the town. Teelow has a younger brother, Jarrod. She was taught at the St Mary's Catholic School in Wellington and completed her education at the St John's College in Dubbo. Teelow took part in athletics events for the Wellington Little Athletics club. At the time of her death, she was enrolled on a bachelor of science human movement course at the University of Technology Sydney.

== Career ==
Aged 13, Teelow began competing in water skiing events. She learnt to ski on the Burrendong Dam in 2007. Teelow was named the Australian and Australian Capital Territory Junior Skier of the Year for 2008 and the New South Wales Junior Skier of the Year. She secured qualification to the 2009 Waterski Racing World Championships in Belgium at the national selection rounds in Lake Charm. Teelow prepared for the competition by broadening her experience on rough waters with ski sessions in Botany Bay and Port Jackson. She came fourth and fifth overall in the concluding two rounds for a final finish of fourth-place overall.

Thereafter, Teelow made appearances in competitions across the world, in such countries as Austria, Belgium, Germany, Italy, Spain, the United Kingdom and the United States. She participated the Catalina Ski Race, the Grafton Bridge to Bridge, and the Bridge to Bridge events in 2011. Teelow sustained a broken ankle during an event in 2012 and she spent time recuperating. In September 2013, she won the Formula 2 category of that year's World Waterski Racing Championships in the Spanish archipelago of the Canary Islands. According to Teelow's father, she planned to progress to the Formula 1/Opens class as the next step of her career.

== Death ==
On the morning of 24 November 2013, she partook in the 75 mi (121 km) Bridge to Bridge Water Ski Classic on the Hawkesbury River to the north of Sydney. Soon after the race had commenced, which was held on calm waters and with a negated wind, Teelow passed under the Hawkesbury River railway bridge at around 75 to 85 miles per hour (121 to 137 km/h) before her driver slowed and an observer raised his left arm to inform her of incoming minor waves. Teelow hit the first wave without incident until her ski was observed to launch airborne ahead of her approximately 2.7 km (1.7 mi) into the race. She flipped and cartwheeled along the water; her ski helmet detached from the first contact with the water.

Teelow had contusions in the upper part of her thoracic and the lower part of her cervical vertebrae; she went into cardiac arrest and the emergency services resuscitated her upon being moved to another slipway. She was transported by helicopter to the Royal North Shore Hospital in Sydney a "critical condition". Teelow was placed on life support before she was declared dead from her injuries at approximately 17:55 local time. She was the seventh water skier in Australia to die from injuries sustained over the previous five years. A subsequent limited autopsy determined Teelow died from an atlanto-occipital dislocation that caused blunt force head and neck injuries due to her striking water at high speed. On the afternoon on 8 December, a memorial to celebrate Teelow's life was held in her memory at the Hunstanton Ski Club.

Her death was investigated by the New South Wales Police Force and the Roads & Maritime Services with co-operation from Ski Racing Australia; the police prepared a report for the New South Wales coroner. The results of the investigation into Teelow's death were published on 31 May 2018. According to the report, it was unable to determine where the wave that Teelow struck originated or whether the ski she used contributed to her accident. The report found her helmet was not a contributing factor to her death. The New South Wales deputy state coroner Teresa O'Sullivan recommended Ski Racing Australia develop technical specifications for ski helmets and flotation devices to suit water skiers and inspect and secure safety equipment before the start of races. She also called for the governing body and the Roads and Maritime Services to consider adopting speed restrictions in the Formula 2 category.

== Personality and legacy ==
Teelow was described by her friends as a "champion on and off the water" and her former school co-ordinator called her "a beautiful girl with such a joyous smile". According to her father, she saved the lives of six individuals through the donation of her organs. The 2014 Bridge to Bridge Water Ski Classic was allowed to commence as scheduled by organisers and was converted into a memorial in Teelow's honour.
