= Orthostatic headache =

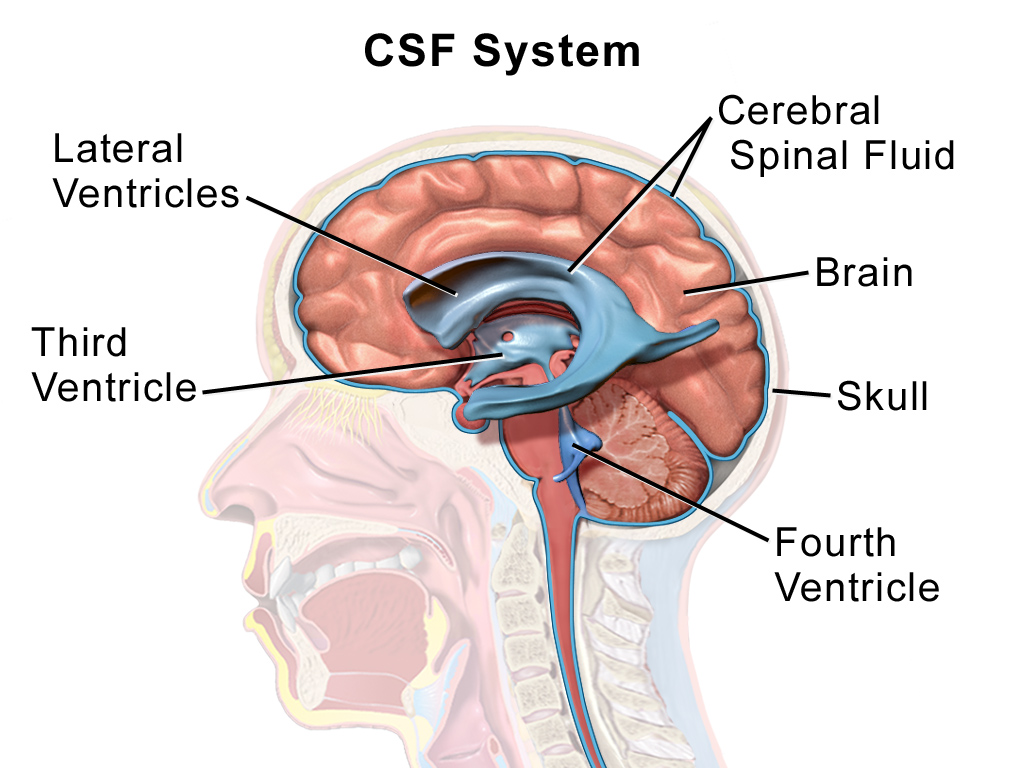
- Location of cerebral spinal fluid within the brain

Orthostatic headache is a medical condition in which a person develops a headache while vertical and the headache is relieved when horizontal. Previously it was often misdiagnosed as different primary headache disorders such as migraine or tension headaches. Increasing awareness of the symptom and its causes has prevented delayed or missed diagnosis.

== Causes ==
The most common cause of orthostatic headache is low cerebrospinal fluid pressure, due to a cerebrospinal fluid leak, or a post-dural-puncture leak. It is also occasionally the most prominent symptom of postural orthostatic tachycardia syndrome (POTS). Distinguishing POTS from a cerebrospinal fluid leak can be difficult, because the defining symptom of POTS, positional tachycardia, also occurs in some people with cerebrospinal fluid leaks. Furthermore, both POTS and cerebrospinal fluid leaks are sometimes present in the same person, especially in people with Ehlers–Danlos syndrome.

Other causes include colloid cysts and possibly connective tissue disorders. It may occur as a complication of decompressive surgery for Chiari malformation or decompressive craniectomies for cerebral edema.

== Mechanism ==
A cerebrospinal fluid leak causes loss of cerebrospinal fluid volume around the brain. This causes the brain to lose its buoyancy, which results in pressure on pain-sensitive areas like the dura and blood vessels. The resulting pain is a headache, and because the brain is more reliant on its buoyancy in an upright position the headache can be relieved by switching to a horizontal position.

== Diagnosis ==
Cerebrospinal fluid leaks are diagnosed by performing different tests. A diagnostic dural puncture is commonly used because its results show the presence of a leak easily. Other types of tests that could be used are cranial CT, cranial MRI, spinal MRI, and CT myelography. A cranial MRI can be diagnostic by showing one of the five main findings, which are subdural fluid collections, enhancement of venous structures, dural enhancement on MRI sagittal views, pituitary hyperemia, and sagging of the brain.

Another cause of orthostatic headaches is postural orthostatic tachycardia syndrome (POTS), a form of dysautonomia, which is diagnosed with autonomic testing instead of the imaging tests that are used to determine a CSF leak. It can be difficult to distinguish if a patient is solely affected by POTS because patients with CSF leaks have similar symptoms and may even develop secondary POTS.

== Management ==
Cerebrospinal fluid leaks can be managed short term with bed rest and plentiful hydration. They can then be treated with an epidural blood patch (EBP) with autologous blood, which is the standard initial procedure. If an EBP is ineffective, surgery is also an option for treatment. A surgical procedure would be customized to the patient depending on the location and size of the leak.

POTS patients manage their symptoms with medication, diet, and preventative behaviors. Drugs such as midodrine, fludrocortisone, droxidopa, and pyridostigmine are sometimes prescribed to help stabilize blood pressure. Patients can work with their diet to ensure they are getting the crucial amount of fluid intake and increasing their intake of salt. Both dietary changes can help prevent symptoms from occurring. Water-bolus treatment can help in times of increased orthostatic stress. Patients drink two 8 ounce glasses of cold water rapidly, which will increase standing blood pressure for a short amount of time.

== Outlook ==
Most orthostatic headaches have a favorable outcome. POTS patients who manage their symptoms can recognize when their symptoms are occurring and prevent them from affecting their everyday life. CSF leaks are usually repaired successfully with only about 10% of patients experiencing recurrence.

== Epidemiology ==
All different types of patients have presented orthostatic headaches as symptoms. It is slightly more prevalent in females, with a female-to-male ratio of 1.5:1. The average age of symptom presentation is around 40 years old; however, there have been cases with patients from all ages. CSF leaks are more common in patients that have connective tissue diseases such as Ehlers-Danlos syndrome.
