= Bridge to Bridge =

Water skiing race

- Genre: Water skiing / power boating
- Frequency: Annual
- Location: Hawkesbury River
- Inaugurated: 1961 / 1933
- Website: www.bridge2bridge.com.au

The Bridge to Bridge refers to both a water skiing race and also a power boating race held on the outskirts of Sydney, Australia. It commences at Brooklyn Bridge and traverses the Hawkesbury River for 112 kilometres to Windsor Bridge.

The inaugural water skiing event was held in 1961.

The inaugural power boating event was held in 1933.

== Incidents ==
In 2013 Sarah Teelow was killed after suffering an atlanto-occipital dislocation.
