= Cerebrospinal fluid leak =

Leakage of fluid surrounding the brain and spinal cord through tears in the dura mater

- Other names: CSF leak
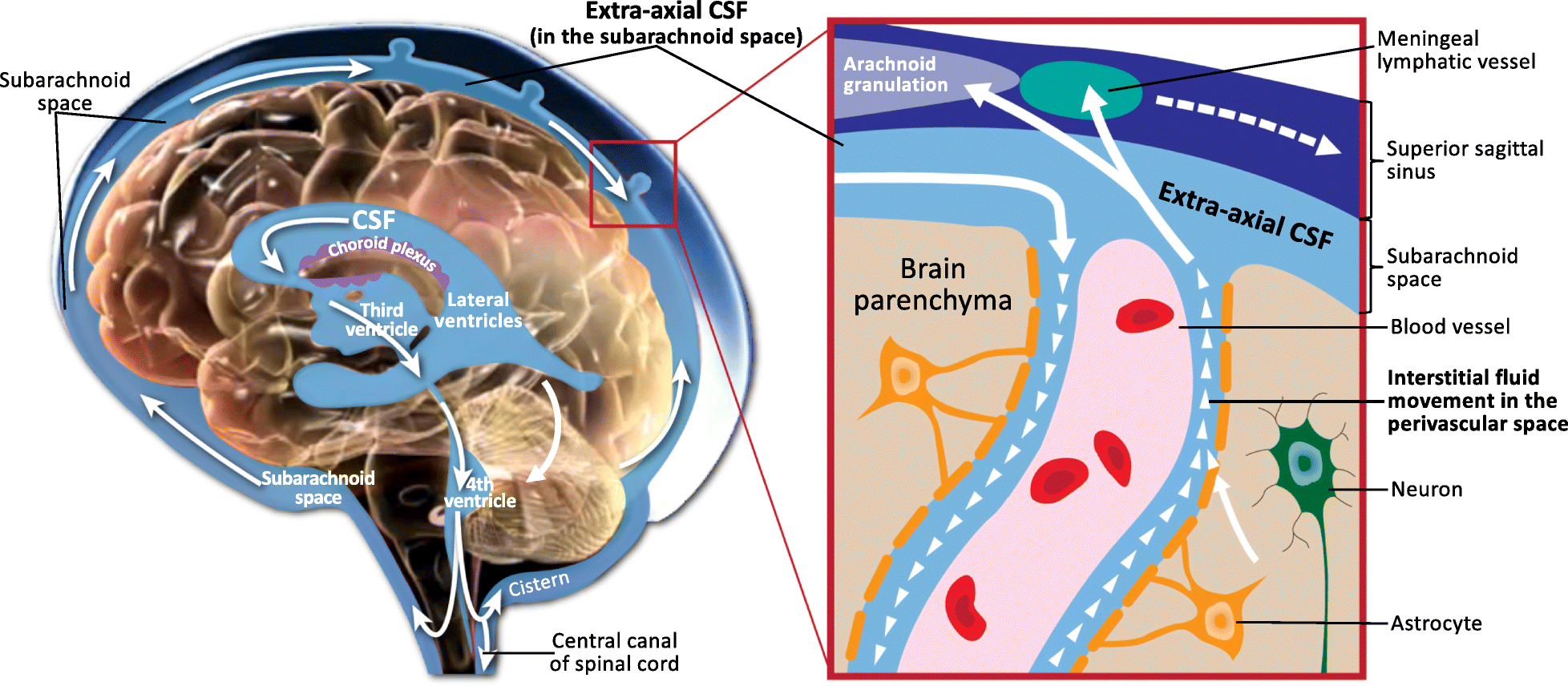
- Circulation of CSF
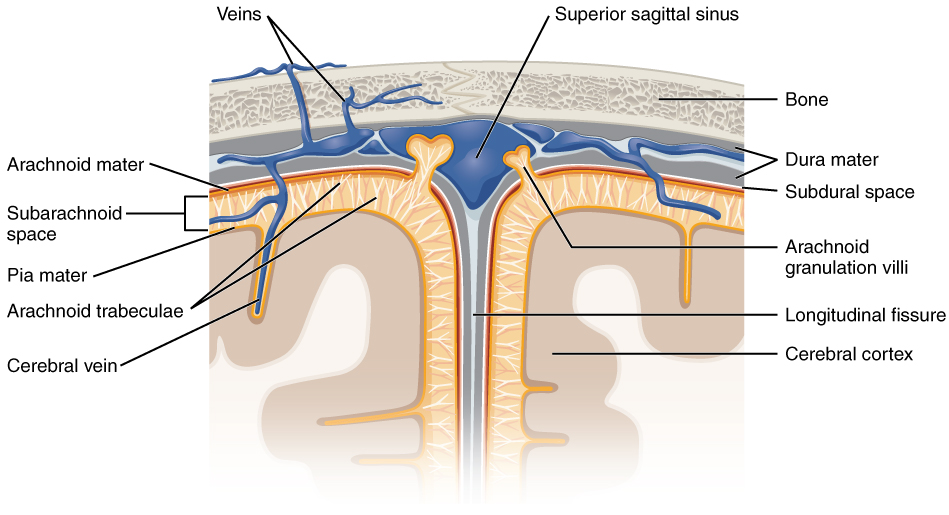
- The meninges of the central nervous system impacted by CSF leak
- Specialty: Neurology

A cerebrospinal fluid leak (CSF leak or CSFL) is a medical condition where the cerebrospinal fluid (CSF) that surrounds the brain and spinal cord leaks out of one or more holes or tears in the dura mater. A CSF leak is classed as either spontaneous (primary), having no known cause (sCSF leak), or nonspontaneous (secondary) where it is attributed to an underlying condition. Causes of a primary CSF leak are those of trauma including from an accident or intentional injury, or arising from a medical intervention known as iatrogenic. A basilar skull fracture as a cause can give the sign of CSF leakage from the ear, nose or mouth. A lumbar puncture can give the symptom of a post-dural-puncture headache.

A cerebrospinal fluid leak can be either cranial or spinal, and these are two different disorders. A spinal CSF leak can be caused by one or more meningeal diverticula or CSF-venous fistulas not associated with an epidural leak. A spontaneous spinal cerebrospinal fluid leak may occur sometimes in those with predisposing heritable connective tissue disorders including Marfan syndrome and Ehlers–Danlos syndromes. A loss of CSF greater than its rate of production leads to a decreased volume inside the skull known as intracranial hypotension.

Any CSF leak is most often characterized by orthostatic headaches, which worsen when standing, and improve when lying down. Other symptoms can include neck pain or stiffness, nausea, vomiting, dizziness, fatigue, and a metallic taste in the mouth. A CT myelography scan can identify the site of a cerebrospinal fluid leakage. Once identified, the leak can often be repaired by an epidural blood patch, an injection of the patient's own blood at the site of the leak, a fibrin glue injection, or surgery.

A spontaneous CSF leak is a rare condition, affecting at least one in 20,000 people and many more who go undiagnosed every year. On average, the condition develops at age 42, and women are twice as likely to be affected. Some people with a sCSF leak have a chronic leak despite repeated patching attempts, leading to long-term disability due to pain and being unable to be upright, and surgery is often needed. The symptoms of a spontaneous CSF leak were first described by German neurologist Georg Schaltenbrand in 1938 and by American neurologist Henry Woltman of the Mayo Clinic in the 1950s.

== Classification ==
Cerebrospinal fluid leaks are classified into two distinct disorders: cranial leaks, and spinal leaks. Where there has been no preceding surgery or medical procedure that may have caused a CSF leak it is called a spontaneous CSF leak (sCSF leak).

=== Cranial leak ===
Cranial leaks occur in the head, and in some of these cases, CSF can leak from one side of the nose, or from the ear. Intracranial hypertension is often associated with a spontaneous cranial CSF leak, rarely reported with a spinal leak.

=== Spinal leak ===
The vast majority of CSF leaks are spinal. Spinal leaks occur when one or more holes form in the dura along the spinal cord. There are three types of spontaneous spinal CSF leaks. A spinal leak typically causes spontaneous intracranial hypotension.

==== Spontaneous intracranial hypotension ====
Spontaneous intracranial hypotension (SIH) refers to lower than normal CSF volume due to a leak of CSF at the level of the spine.

Spontaneous intracranial hypotension (SIH) is an important cause of longstanding headaches. Other symptoms can include nausea, blurred vision, coma, and dementia. SIH is typically secondary to a spontaneous spinal CSF leak. Cranial CSF leaks do not cause SIH. While this symptom can be referred to as intracranial hypotension, the intracranial pressure may be normal, with the underlying issue instead being low CSF volume, in this case a sCSFL may be referred to as CSF hypovolemia.

== Signs and symptoms ==
=== Spinal CSF leaks ===
Symptoms resulting from nerve impact
Nerve	Function	Symptoms
optic (2)	optic nerve crossing	blurred and or double vision
chorda tympani (Branch of 7)	taste	taste distortion
facial (7)	facial nerve	facial weakness and numbness
vestibulocochlear (8)	hearing, balance	hearing and balance problems
glossopharyngeal (9)	taste	taste distortion

The most common symptom of a spinal CSF leak is a fast-onset, extremely painful orthostatic headache. This headache is usually made worse by standing and typically becomes prominent throughout the day, with the pain becoming less severe when lying down. Orthostatic headaches can become chronic and disabling to the point of incapacitation. Some people will develop headaches that begin in the afternoon. This is known as second-half-of-the-day headache. This may be an initial presentation of a spontaneous CSF leak or appear after treatment such as an epidural patch, and likely indicates a slow spinal CSF leak. While high CSF pressure can make lying down unbearable, low CSF pressure due to a leak can be relieved by lying flat on the back.

About 50% of people with a spinal CSFL experience neck pain or stiffness, nausea, and vomiting.

Other symptoms of a CSF leak include photophobia, dizziness and vertigo, gait disturbances, tinnitus, facial numbness or weakness, visual disturbances, brain fog or difficulties with concentration, neuralgia, fatigue, fluid dripping from the nose or ears.

Aural symptoms are also present in many cases of intracranial hypotension due to CSF leak; including muffled hearing, pulsatile tinnitus, hearing loss. Less common symptoms include double vision (due to cranial nerve 6 palsy) or tremor.

Movement disorders are uncommon in spontaneous CSF leaks but occasionally can be one of the major components of the clinical presentation.

Some cases of chronic intracranial hypotension due to CSF leak may present as personality changes, altered behaviors and impairment of executive functions, similar to behavioral-variant frontotemporal dementia as the frontal and temporal lobes are affected by downward sagging due to reduced intra-cranial pressures.

An untreated CSF leak can result in coma or death as late stage findings as the brainstem herniates through the skull base or foramen magnum.

=== Cranial CSF leaks ===
Cranial leaks occur in the skull. Symptoms often include a watery discharge including CSF from one side of the nose, or from the ear. There may also be a metallic taste in the mouth.

== Causes ==
A spontaneous spinal CSF leak refers to any CSF leak that has not been preceded by a surgical or other medical procedure. Later evidence suggests that these leaks result from either a discogenic pathology, such as microspur, osteophyte or spinal disc herniation that pierces the dura like a knife, connective tissue disorder (which can often lead to discogenic pathology), or spinal drainage problems.

A cerebrospinal fluid leak can be a rare complication of an anterior cervical discectomy and fusion. One study suggested a CSF leak to follow from 0.5% of operations. Another study suggests a CSF leak to follow from 1% of operations. In most of these cases repair is successful.

=== Discogenic causes ===
The most common cause of an intractable sCSF leak is discogenic, either from a spinal disc herniation, osteophyte or microspur on the disc or vertebral body. "Recent radiological and microsurgical investigations revealed that a calcified, degenerative bony microspur is often the culprit lesion in cases of intractable CSF leaks. Arising from the level of the intervertebrate disk space, these microspurs pierce the ventral dura and produce a slit-like defect a few millimeters in length. These microspurs and the associated CSF leak have to be localized exactly, and then they are amenable to surgical treatment."

=== Connective tissue theory ===
Various scientists and physicians have suggested that sCSFLs may be the result of an underlying connective tissue disorder affecting the spinal dura. It may also run in families and be associated with aortic aneurysms and joint hypermobility.

Up to two thirds of those affected demonstrate some type of generalized connective tissue disorder. Marfan syndrome, Ehlers–Danlos syndrome, and autosomal dominant polycystic kidney disease are the three most common connective tissue disorders associated with sCSFLs. Roughly 20% of patients with a sCSFL exhibit features of Marfan syndrome, including tall stature, hollowed chest (pectus excavatum), joint hypermobility and arched palate. However, no other Marfan syndrome presentations are shown.

=== Spinal drainage theory ===
Some studies have proposed that issues with the spinal venous drainage system may cause a CSF leak. According to this theory, dural holes and intracranial hypotension are symptoms caused by low venous pressure in the epidural space. When leg muscles pump blood towards the heart, and pressure in the inferior vena cava vein becomes negative, the network of epidural veins is overdrained, causing CSF to be aspirated into the epidural space. True leaks can form at weak points in the spinal meninges. Therefore, the observed CSF hypotension is a result of CSF hypovolemia and reduced epidural venous pressure.

=== Other causes ===
Cranial CSF leaks result from intracranial hypertension in the vast majority of cases. The increased pressure causes a rupture of the cranial dura mater, leading to a CSF leak and intracranial hypotension. Patients with a nude nerve root, where the root sleeve is absent, are at increased risk for developing recurrent CSF leaks. Lumbar disc herniation has been reported to cause CSF leaks in at least one case. Degenerative spinal disc diseases cause a disc to pierce the dura mater, leading to a CSF leak.

CSF leaks can result from a lumbar puncture procedure.

== Complications ==
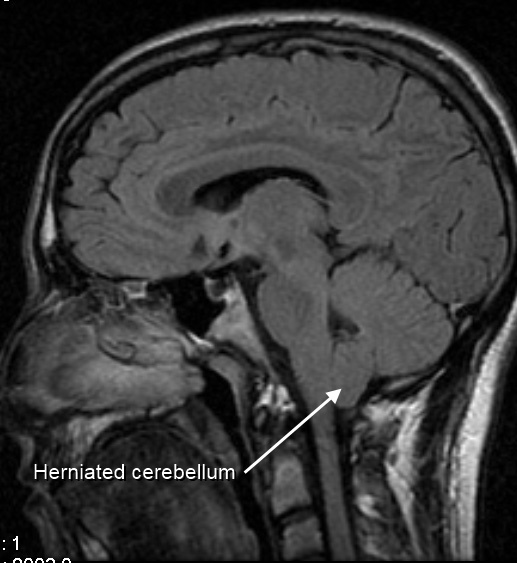
Arnold–Chiari malformation is a condition where the cerebellar tonsils have descended, and should be considered in differential diagnosis of sCSFLS.

Several complications can occur as a result of sCSFLS including decreased cranial pressure, brain herniation, infection, blood pressure problems, transient paralysis, and coma. The primary and most serious complication of a spontaneous cerebrospinal fluid leak is spontaneous intracranial hypotension, where pressure in the brain is severely decreased. This complication leads to the hallmark symptom of severe orthostatic headaches.

People with cranial CSF leaks, the rarer form, have a 10% risk of developing meningitis per year. If cranial leaks last more than seven days, the chances of developing meningitis are significantly higher. Spinal CSF leaks cannot result in meningitis due to the sterile conditions of the leak site. When a CSF leak occurs at the temporal bone, surgery becomes necessary in order to prevent infection and repair the leak. Orthostatic hypotension is another complication that occurs due to autonomic dysfunction when blood pressure drops significantly. The autonomic dysfunction is caused by compression of the brainstem, which controls breathing and circulation.

Low CSF volume can cause the cerebellar tonsil position to descend, which can be mistaken for Chiari malformation; however when the CSF leak is repaired the tonsil position often returns to normal (as seen in upright MRI) in this "pseudo-Chiari" condition. A further, albeit rare, complication of CSF leak is transient quadriplegia due to a sudden and significant loss of CSF. This loss results in hindbrain herniation and causes major compression of the upper cervical spinal cord. The quadriplegia dissipates once the patient lies supine. An extremely rare complication of sCSFL is third nerve palsy, where the ability to move one's eyes becomes difficult and interrupted due to compression of the third cranial nerve.

There are documented cases of reversible frontotemporal dementia and coma. Coma due to a CSF leak has been successfully treated by using blood patches and/or fibrin glue and placing the person in the Trendelenburg position. Empty sella syndrome, a bony structure that surround the pituitary gland, occurs in CSF leak patients.

== Pathophysiology ==
Cerebrospinal fluid is produced by the choroid plexus in the ventricles of the brain and contained by the dura and arachnoid layers of the meninges. The brain floats in CSF, which also transports nutrients to the brain and spinal cord. As holes form in the spinal dura mater, CSF leaks out into the surrounding space. The CSF is then absorbed into the spinal epidural venous plexus or soft tissues around the spine. Due to the sterile conditions of the soft tissues around the spine, there is no risk of meningitis.

=== Brain sagging ===
Lack of CSF pressure and volume can allow the brain to sag and descend through the foramen magnum (large opening) of the occipital bone, at the base of the skull. The lower portion of the brain is believed to stretch or impact one or more cranial nerve complexes, thereby causing a variety of sensory symptoms. Nerves that can be affected and their related symptoms are detailed in the table at right. A rare form of dementia known as brain sagging dementia may be caused by a sagging brain, a characteristic of intracranial hypotension.

== Diagnosis ==
Diagnosis of CSF leakage can be done by various imaging techniques, chemical tests of bodily fluid discharged from a head orifice, or clinical examination. The use of CT, MRI, and assays are the most common types of CSF leak instrumental tests. Many CSF leaks do not show up on imaging and chemical assays, thus such diagnostic tools are not definitive to rule out CSF leaks. A clinician may often depend upon patient history and exam to diagnose, for example: discharge of excessive amount of clear fluid from the nose upon bending over, the increase in headache following a Valsalva maneuver or the reduction of headache when the patient takes a prone position are positive indicators.

A clinical exam is often used as a means to diagnose CSF leaks. Improved patient response to conservative treatment may further define a positive diagnosis. The lack of clinician awareness of the signs -symptoms and ailments- of a CSF leak is the greatest challenge to proper diagnosis and treatment, in particular: the loss of the orthostatic characteristic of headache and that every chronic CSF leaker will have a unique symptom set that as a whole contributes to the underlying condition, and diagnosis of, a CSF leak.

The primary place of first complaint to a physician is a hospital emergency room. Up to 94% of those with sCSFLS are initially misdiagnosed. Incorrect diagnoses include migraines, meningitis, Chiari malformation, and psychiatric disorders. The average time from onset of symptoms until definitive diagnosis is 13 months. A 2007 study found a 0% success rate for proper diagnosis in the emergency department.

=== CT ===
Diagnosis of a cerebrospinal fluid leak is performed through a combination of non-invasive measurement of intracranial pressure methods of the CSF pressure, and a computed tomography myelogram (CTM) scan of the spinal column for fluid leaks. The opening fluid pressure in the spinal canal is obtained by performing a lumbar puncture, also known as a spinal tap. Once the pressure is measured, a radiocontrast agent is injected into the spinal fluid. The contrast then diffuses out through the dura sac before leaking through dural holes. This allows for a CTM with fluoroscopy to locate and image any sites of dura rupture via contrast seen outside the dura sac in the imagery.

=== MRI ===
There is disagreement over whether MRI should be the diagnostic tool of choice. Magnetic resonance imaging is less effective than CT at directly imaging sites of CSF leak. MRI studies may show pachymeningeal enhancement (when the dura mater looks thick and inflamed), sagging of the brain, pituitary enlargement, subdural hygromas, engorgement of cerebral venous sinuses, and other abnormalities. For 20% of patients, MRIs present as completely normal. MRIs performed with the patient seated upright (vs. laying supine) are not better for diagnosing CSF leaks, but are more than twice as effective at diagnosing cerebellar tonsillar ectopia, also known as Chiari malformation. Cerebellar tonsillar ectopia shares many of the same symptoms as CSF leak, but originates either congenitally or from trauma, including whiplash strain to the dura.

An alternate method of locating the site of a CSF leak is to use heavily T2-weighted MR myelography. This has been effective in identifying the sites of a CSF leak without the need for a CT scan, lumbar puncture, and contrast and at locating fluid collections such as CSF pooling. Another highly successful method of locating a CSF leak is intrathecal contrast and MR myelography.

Contrast-enhanced brain MRI with sagittal reformats can assess for the following:

- Subdural fluid collections
- Enhancement of the meninges
- Engorgement of venous structures
- Pituitary swelling
- Sagging of the brain

For suspected spinal CSF leaks, spine imaging can be used to guide treatment.

=== Assay ===
Fluid dripping from the nose (CSF rhinorrhoea) or ears (CSF otorrhea) should be collected and tested for the protein beta-2 transferrin which would be highly accurate in identifying CS fluid and diagnosing a cranial CSF leak.

=== CSF analysis ===
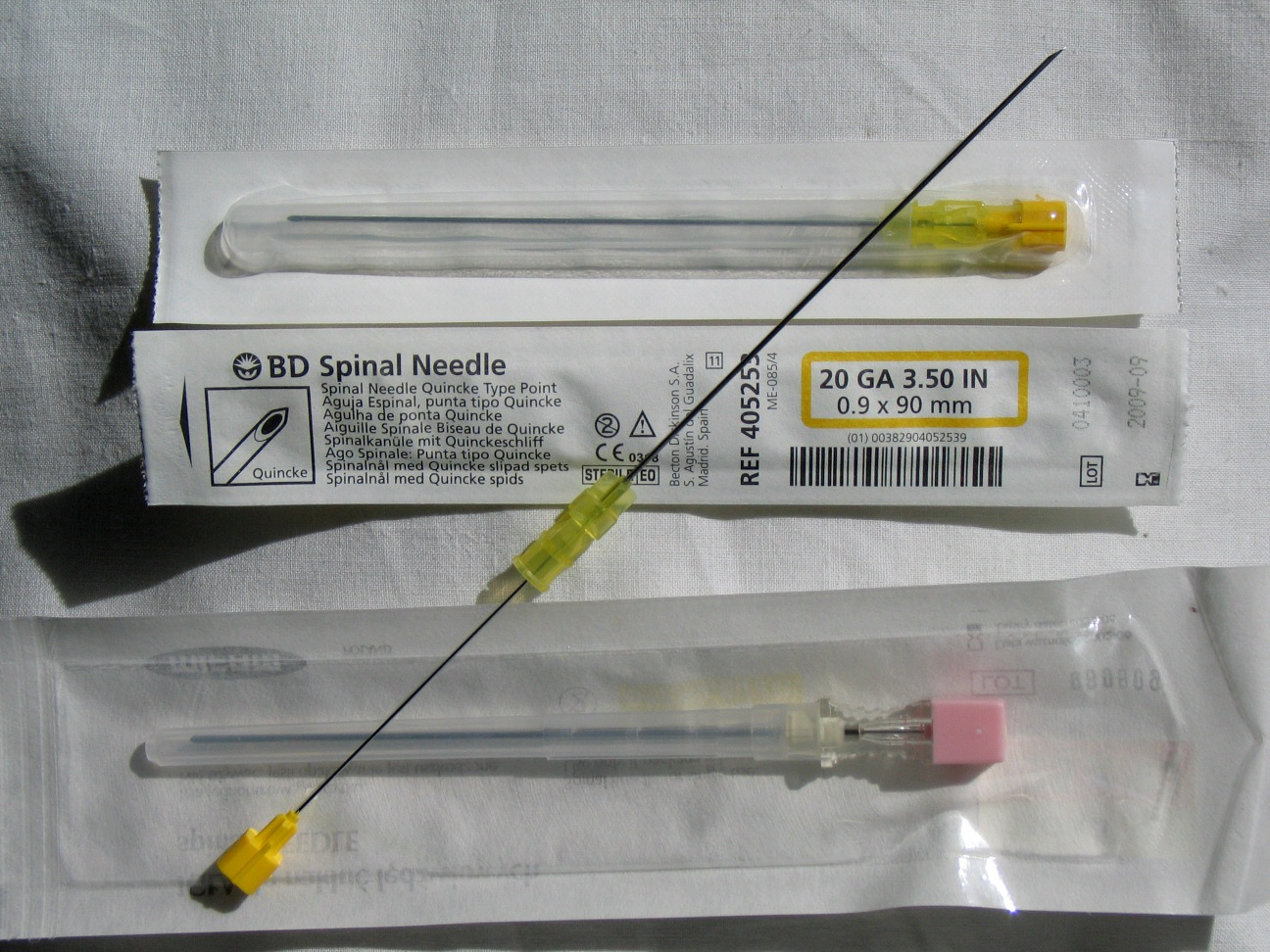
Spinal needles used in lumbar puncture and introduction of contrast into the spine

Patients with CSF leaks have been noted to have very low or even negative opening pressures during lumbar puncture. However, patients with confirmed CSF leaks may also demonstrate completely normal opening pressures. In 18–46% of cases, the CSF pressure is measured within the normal range. Analysis of spinal fluid may demonstrate lymphocytic pleocytosis and elevated protein content or xanthochromia. This is hypothesized to be due to increased permeability of dilated meningeal blood vessels and a decrease of CSF flow in the lumbar subarachnoid space.

=== Myelography ===
For patients with recalcitrant spontaneous intracranial hypotension and no leak found on conventional spinal imaging, digital subtraction myelography, CT myelography and dynamic myelography (a modified conventional myelography technique) should be considered to rule out a CSF-venous fistula. In addition, presence of a hyperdense paraspinal vein should be investigated in imaging as it is highly suggestive of a CSF venous fistula.

== Treatment ==
Symptomatic treatment usually involves analgesics for both cranial and spinal CSF leaks. Initial measures can include rest, caffeine intake (via coffee or intravenous infusion), and hydration. Corticosteroids may provide transient relief for some patients. An abdominal binder, which increases intracranial pressure by compressing the abdomen, can temporarily relieve symptoms for some people. Sometimes a CSF leak will heal on its own. Otherwise, symptoms may last months or even years.

=== Epidural blood patch ===
The epidural syringe is filled with autologous blood and injected in the epidural space in order to close holes in the dura mater.

The treatment of choice for this condition is the surgical application of epidural blood patches, which has a higher success rate than conservative treatments of bed rest and hydration. Through the injection of a person's own blood into the area of the hole in the dura, an epidural blood patch uses blood's clotting factors to clot the sites of holes. The volume of autologous blood and number of patch attempts for patients is highly variable. One-quarter to one-third of those with a sCSFL patients do not have relief of symptoms from epidural blood patching. Finding the location of a cerebrospinal fluid leak is not required prior to using an epidural blood patch as initial lumbar epidural blood patches often provide relief of symptoms and resolve the leak without further intervention.

=== Fibrin glue sealant ===
If blood patches alone do not succeed in closing the dural tears, placement of percutaneous fibrin glue can be used in place of blood patching, raising the effectiveness of forming a clot and arresting CSF leakage.

=== Surgical drain technique ===
In extreme cases of intractable CSF leak, a surgical lumbar drain has been used. This procedure is believed to decrease spinal CSF volume while increasing intracranial CSF pressure and volume. This procedure restores normal intracranial CSF volume and pressure while promoting the healing of dural tears by lowering the pressure and volume in the dura. This procedure has led to positive results leading to relief of symptoms for up to one year.

=== Neurosurgical repair ===
Surgery to treat a CSF-venous fistula in CSF leak patients is highly effective. Neurosurgery is available to directly repair leaking meningeal diverticula. The areas of dura leak can be tied together in a process called ligation and then a metal clip can be placed in order to hold the ligation closed. Alternatively, a small compress called a pledget can be placed over the dura leak and then sealed with gel foam and fibrin glue. Primary suturing is rarely able to repair a CSF leak, and in some patients exploration of the dura may be required to properly locate all sites of CSF leak.

=== Adjunct measures ===
The use of antibiotics to prevent meningitis in those with a CSF leak due to a basilar skull fracture is of unclear benefit.

== Prognosis ==
Long-term outcomes for people with sCSFLS remain poorly studied. Symptoms may resolve in as little as two weeks as the dura mater lining heals naturally, or they can persist for months. Less commonly, patients may have unremitting symptoms for many years. People with chronic sCSFLS may be disabled and unable to work. Recurrent CSF leak at an alternate site after recent repair is common.

== Epidemiology ==
A 1994 community-based study indicated that two out of every 100,000 people with a sCSF, while a 2004 emergency room-based study indicated five per 100,000. sCSF leaks generally affect the young and middle aged; the average age for onset is 42.3 years, but onset can range from ages 22 to 61. In an 11-year study, women were found to be twice as likely to be affected as men.

Studies have shown that sCSF leaks runs in families. It is suspected that genetic similarity in families includes weakness in the dura mater which leads to a sCSFL. Large scale population-based studies have not yet been conducted. While a majority of sCSF leaks continue to be undiagnosed or misdiagnosed, an actual increase in occurrence is unlikely.

== History ==
Spontaneous CSF leaks have been described by notable physicians and reported in medical journals dating back to the early 1900s. German neurologist Georg Schaltenbrand reported in 1938 and 1953 what he termed "aliquorrhea", a condition marked by very low, unobtainable, or even negative CSF pressures. The symptoms included orthostatic headaches and other features that are now recognized as spontaneous intracranial hypotension. A few decades earlier, the same syndrome had been described in French literature as "hypotension of spinal fluid" and "ventricular collapse". In 1940, Henry Woltman of the Mayo Clinic wrote about "headaches associated with decreased intracranial pressure". The full clinical manifestations of intracranial hypotension and CSF leaks were described in several publications reported between the 1960s and early 1990s. Modern reports of spontaneous CSF leak have been reported to medical journals since the late 1980s.

== Research ==
Tetracosactide is a corticosteroid that causes the brain to produce additional spinal fluid to replace the volume of the lost CSF and alleviate symptoms, and has been given intravenously to treat CSF leaks.

In three small studies of 1-2 patients with recurrent CSF leaks where repeated blood patches failed to form clots and relieve symptoms, the patients received temporary but complete resolution of symptoms with an epidural saline infusion. The saline infusion temporarily restores the volume necessary for a patient to avoid SIH until the leak can be repaired properly. Intrathecal saline infusion is used in urgent cases such as intractable pain or decreased consciousness.

The gene TGFBR2 has been implicated in several connective tissue disorders including Marfan syndrome, arterial tortuosity, and thoracic aortic aneurysm. A study of people with a sCSF leak demonstrated no mutations in this gene. Minor features of Marfan syndrome have been found in 20% of CSF leak patients. Abnormal findings of fibrillin-1 have been documented in these CSF leak patients, but only one patient demonstrated a fibrillin-1 defect consistent with Marfan syndrome.

== See also ==
- Subdural effusion
- Cerebral shunt
