= Walter Essex Wynter =

British physician

Walter Essex Wynter (1860–1945) was a British physician who is noted for his role in the development of the procedure of lumbar puncture, the means by which cerebrospinal fluid (CSF) is obtained for the diagnosis of meningitis and other diseases.

Wynter was the son of Andrew Wynter, a physician and the editor of the British Medical Journal from 1855 to 1861. He was educated at Epsom College, Surrey, and at Middlesex Hospital. During his training he reported four cases in which he performed CSF drainage in children for the treatment of meningitis in the Lancet. His procedure involved an incision and the insertion of a tube to relieve pressure, but all four patients died. He became a physician at Middlesex hospital in 1901.

Wynter retired to Bartholomew Manor at Newbury in Berkshire where he founded the Essex Wynter Charity, providing housing for retired nurses from Middlesex Hospital in the former Raymond Almshouses alongside his home. He is buried nearby in the Newtown Road Cemetery.
