= Ultrasound-guided lumbar puncture =

Medical procedure used to obtain cerebrospinal fluid for diagnostic purposes

- Purpose: To obtain cerebrospinal fluid

Ultrasound-guided lumbar puncture is a medical procedure used in some emergency departments to obtain cerebrospinal fluid for diagnostic purposes. In contrast to standard lumbar puncture by palpation, the use of ultrasound imaging may reduce the number of failed punctures, needle insertions, and needle redirections. Ultrasound-guided lumbar puncture was first described in Russian medical literature in 1971.
