= Atlanto-occipital dislocation =

Deadly cervical spine injury

Atlanto-occipital dislocation, orthopedic decapitation, or internal decapitation describes ligamentous separation of the spinal column from the skull base. It is possible for a human to survive such an injury; however, 70% of cases result in immediate death. It should not be confused with atlanto-axial dislocation, which describes ligamentous separation between the first and second cervical vertebra.

== Mechanism ==
The injury is a result of disruption of the stabilizing ligaments between the occiput, or posterior skull base, and the C1 vertebral body, otherwise known as the atlas. The diagnosis is usually suspected by history and physical exam, but confirmed by imaging, typically by CT due to its faster speed in the acute trauma setting, although MRI can also help with assessment in equivocal cases. The treatment is initial stabilization with a cervical spine collar, and then surgical intervention in cases in which reversal of paralysis is possible. The most common mechanism of injury is high-speed motor vehicle accidents. The injury is more likely in children due to the large size of their heads relative to their bodies, and more horizontal orientation of the occipital condyles. It represents <1% of all cervical spine injuries.

Several subtypes of atlanto-occipital dislocation are known. One suggested categorization scheme includes anterior, vertical and posterior of the head relative to the spine. Other variants with lateral or rotatory displacement have been described, as well as mixed types. Common etiology for such injuries is sudden and severe deceleration leading to a whiplash-like mechanism.

== Diagnosis ==
The distances between the dens and surrounding structures are also key features that can suggest the diagnosis, with the normal distance between the dens and basion (i.e., dens–basion interval; BDI) measuring less than 9 mm on CT, and the distance between the atlas and dens (i.e., atlas–dens interval; ADI) measuring less than 3 mm on CT, although this can be increased in cases of rheumatoid arthritis due to pannus formation.

Several indirect measurements on CT can be used to assess ligamentous integrity at the craniocervical junction. The Wackenheim line, a straight line extending along the posterior margin of the clivus through the dens, should not intersect the dens on plain film, with violation of this relationship raising concern for basilar invagination. The basion to axion interval, or BAI, is also used, which is determined by measuring the distance between an imaginary vertical line at the anterior skull base, or basion, at the foramen magnum, and the axis of the cervical spine along its posterior margin, which should measure 12 mm, an assessment more reliable on radiograph than CT. The distance between the atlas and the occipital condyles, the atlanto-occipital interval (AOI), should measure less than 4 mm, and is better assessed on coronal images.

The Powers ratio was formerly used, which was the tip of the basion to the spinolaminar line, divided by the distance from the tip of the opisthion to the midpoint of the posterior aspect of the anterior arch of C1. It is no longer recommended due to low sensitivity and difficulty identifying landmarks. It also will miss vertical or posterior displacement of the cervical spine.

Other measurements include occiput-atlas distance, angle between anterior arch of atlas and axis, vertical distance between posterior arch of atlas and spinous process of axis, vertical atlanto-dens interval, and joint space between C1 and C2.

== Treatment ==
Treatment involves fixation of the cervical spine to the skull base, or occipitocervical fusion, using paramedian rods and transpedicular screws with cross-links for stabilization. The patient is subsequently unable to rotate their head in the horizontal plane. If there is obstructive hydrocephalus, a pseudomeningocele can form, which is decompressed at the time of surgery.

== Prognosis ==
The injury is immediately fatal in 70% of cases, with an additional 15% surviving to the emergency room but dying during the subsequent hospital stay. A basion-dental interval (BSI) of 16 mm or greater is associated with mortality. In those with neurologic deficits, survival is unlikely.

Most deaths result from mechanical damage to the spinal cord and lower brainstem, ranging from localized contusion to diffuse axonal injury to complete transection. Vascular complications are also frequent and may contribute significantly to delayed mortality. Combined dissections of the vertebral and carotid arteries can lead to severe cerebral ischemia, whereas rupture of the vertebral artery–PICA junction results in subarachnoid hemorrhage, compressing the brainstem. Hydrocephalus may also develop and cause a dangerous increase of intracranial pressure. Further possible complications include damage to prevertebral structures (pharynx, lower cranial nerves) and the cerebellum. Therefore, initial survivors of atlantooccipital dislocation may show severe and variable neurologic deficits, including reversible or irreversible tetraplegia, multiple cranial nerve deficits, loss of consciousness, and recurrent respiratory and/or cardiac arrests.

Children are more likely to survive with neurologic compromise than adults. Isolated cases of near-complete recovery after life-threatening symptoms are known.

In case of posterior displacement of the head, a concomitant fracture of the atlas with backward migration of the posterior arch is associated with improved chance of survival, as this allows the spinal cord and medulla to migrate backward without getting crushed.

== Proximal cervical fractures associated with injury ==
The Jefferson fracture can be associated with this injury, with the C1 ring, or atlas, being fractured in several places, allowing the spine to shift forward relative to the skull base. The Hangman's fracture which is a fracture of the C2 vertebral body or dens of the cervical spine upon which the skull base sits to allow the head to rotate, can also be associated with atlanto-occipital dislocation. Despite its eponym, the fracture is not usually associated with a hanging mechanism of injury.
