= Lumbar puncture =

Procedure to collect cerebrospinal fluid

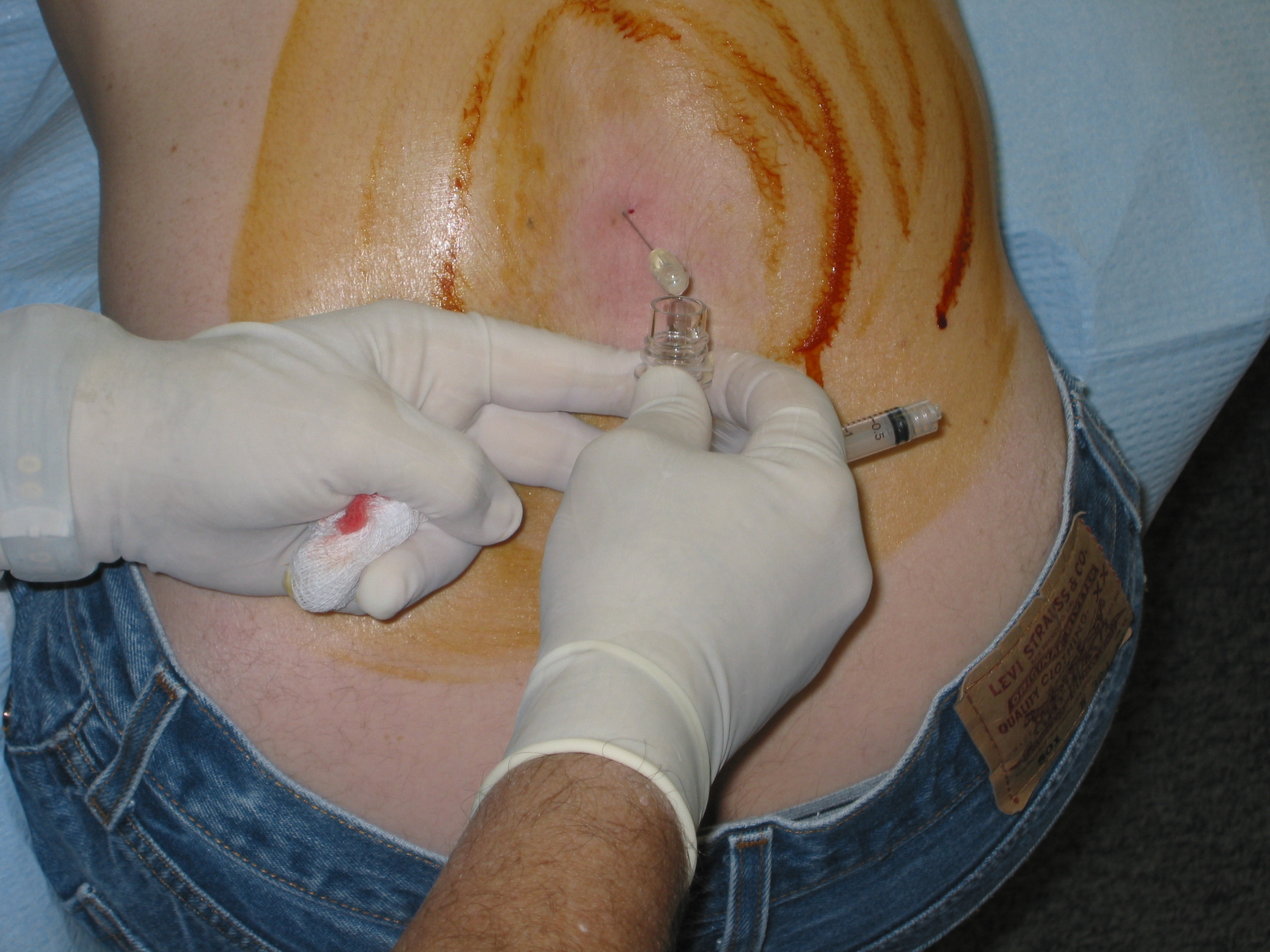
- Lumbar puncture in a sitting position. The reddish-brown swirls on the patient's back are tincture of iodine (an antiseptic).
- Other names: Spinal tap
- ICD-9-CM: 03.31
- MeSH: D013129
- eMedicine: 80773

Lumbar puncture (LP), also known as a spinal tap, is a medical procedure in which a needle is inserted into the spinal canal, most commonly to collect cerebrospinal fluid (CSF) for diagnostic testing. The main reason for a lumbar puncture is to help diagnose diseases of the central nervous system, including the brain and spine. Examples of these conditions include meningitis and subarachnoid hemorrhage. It may also be used therapeutically in some conditions. Increased intracranial pressure (pressure in the skull) is a contraindication, due to risk of brain matter being compressed and pushed toward the spine. Sometimes, lumbar punctures cannot be performed safely (for example due to a severe bleeding tendency). It is regarded as a safe procedure, but post-dural-puncture headache is a common side effect if a small atraumatic needle is not used.

The procedure is typically performed under local anesthesia using a sterile technique. A hypodermic needle is used to access the subarachnoid space and collect fluid. Fluid may be sent for biochemical, microbiological, and cytological analysis. Using ultrasound to landmark may increase success.

Lumbar punctures were first introduced in 1891 by the German physician Heinrich Quincke.

== Medical uses ==
The reason for a lumbar puncture may be to make a diagnosis or to treat a disease, as outlined below.

=== Diagnosis ===
The chief diagnostic indications of lumbar puncture are for collection of cerebrospinal fluid (CSF). Analysis of CSF may exclude infectious, inflammatory, and neoplastic diseases affecting the central nervous system. The most common purpose is in suspected meningitis, since there is no other reliable tool with which meningitis, a life-threatening but highly treatable condition, can be excluded. A lumbar puncture can also be used to detect whether someone has Stage 1 or Stage 2 Trypanosoma brucei. Young infants commonly require lumbar puncture as a part of the routine workup for fever without a source. This is due to higher rates of meningitis than in older persons. Infants also do not reliably show classic symptoms of meningeal irritation (meningismus) like neck stiffness and headache the way adults do. In any age group, subarachnoid hemorrhage, hydrocephalus, benign intracranial hypertension, and many other diagnoses may be supported or excluded with this test. It may also be used to detect the presence of malignant cells in the CSF, as in carcinomatous meningitis or medulloblastoma. CSF containing less than 10 red blood cells (RBCs)/mm^{3} constitutes a "negative" tap in the context of a workup for subarachnoid hemorrhage, for example. Taps that are "positive" have an RBC count of 100/mm^{3} or more.

=== Treatment ===
Lumbar punctures may also be done to inject medications into the cerebrospinal fluid ("intrathecally"), particularly for spinal anesthesia or chemotherapy.

Serial lumbar punctures may be useful in temporary treatment of idiopathic intracranial hypertension (IIH). This disease is characterized by increased pressure of CSF which may cause headache and permanent loss of vision. While mainstays of treatment are medication, in some cases lumbar puncture performed multiple times may improve symptoms. It is not recommended as a staple of treatment due to discomfort and risk of the procedure, and the short duration of its efficacy.

Additionally, some people with normal pressure hydrocephalus (characterized by urinary incontinence, a changed ability to walk properly, and dementia) receive some relief of symptoms after removal of CSF.

== Contraindications ==
Lumbar puncture should not be performed in the following situations:

- Idiopathic (unidentified cause) increased intracranial pressure (ICP)
  - Rationale: lumbar puncture in the presence of raised ICP may cause uncal herniation
  - Exception: therapeutic use of lumbar puncture to reduce ICP, but only if obstruction (for example in the third ventricle of the brain) has been ruled out
  - Precaution
    - CT brain, especially in the following situations
      - Age >65
      - Reduced GCS
      - Recent history of seizure
      - Focal neurological signs
      - Abnormal respiratory pattern
      - Hypertension with bradycardia and deteriorating consciousness
    - Ophthalmoscopy for papilledema
- Bleeding diathesis (relative)
  - Coagulopathy
  - Decreased platelet count (<50 billion/L)
- Infections
  - Skin infection at puncture site
- Vertebral deformities (scoliosis or kyphosis), in hands of an inexperienced physician.

== Adverse effects ==
=== Headache ===
Post-dural-puncture headache with nausea is the most common complication; it often responds to pain medications and infusion of fluids. It was long taught that this complication can be prevented by strict maintenance of a supine posture for two hours after the successful puncture; this has not been borne out in modern studies involving large numbers of people. Doing the procedure with the person on their side might decrease the risk. Intravenous caffeine injection is often quite effective in aborting these spinal headaches. A headache that is persistent despite a long period of bedrest and occurs only when sitting up may be indicative of a CSF leak from the lumbar puncture site. It can be treated by more bedrest, or by an epidural blood patch, where the person's own blood is injected back into the site of leakage to cause a clot to form and seal off the leak.

The risk of headache and need for analgesia and blood patch is much reduced if "atraumatic" needles are used. This does not affect the success rate of the procedure in other ways. Although the cost and difficulty are similar, adoption remains low, at only 16% c. 2014.

The headaches may be caused by inadvertent puncture of the dura mater.

=== Other ===
Contact between the side of the lumbar puncture needle and a spinal nerve root can result in anomalous sensations (paresthesia) in a leg during the procedure; this is harmless and people can be warned about it in advance to minimize their anxiety if it should occur.

Serious complications of a properly performed lumbar puncture are extremely rare. They include spinal or epidural bleeding, adhesive arachnoiditis and trauma to the spinal cord or spinal nerve roots resulting in weakness or loss of sensation, or even paraplegia. The latter is exceedingly rare, since the level at which the spinal cord ends (normally the inferior border of L1, although it is slightly lower in infants) is several vertebral spaces above the proper location for a lumbar puncture (L3/L4). There are case reports of lumbar puncture resulting in perforation of abnormal dural arterio-venous malformations, resulting in catastrophic epidural hemorrhage; this is exceedingly rare.

The procedure is not recommended when epidural infection is present or suspected, when topical infections or dermatological conditions pose a risk of infection at the puncture site or in patients with severe psychosis or neurosis with back pain. Some authorities believe that withdrawal of fluid when initial pressures are abnormal could result in spinal cord compression or cerebral herniation; others believe that such events are merely coincidental in time, occurring independently as a result of the same pathology that the lumbar puncture was performed to diagnose. In any case, computed tomography of the brain is often performed prior to lumbar puncture if an intracranial mass is suspected.

CSF leaks can result from a lumbar puncture procedure.

== Technique ==
=== Mechanism ===
The brain and spinal cord are enveloped by a layer of cerebrospinal fluid, 125–150 mL in total (in adults) which acts as a shock absorber and provides a medium for the transfer of nutrients and waste products. The majority is produced by the choroid plexus in the brain and circulates from there to other areas, before being reabsorbed into the circulation (predominantly by the arachnoid granulations).

The cerebrospinal fluid can be accessed most safely in the lumbar cistern. Below the first or second lumbar vertebrae (L1 or L2) the spinal cord terminates (conus medullaris). Nerves continue down the spine below this, but in a loose bundle of nerve fibers called the cauda equina. There is lower risk with inserting a needle into the spine at the level of the cauda equina because these loose fibers move out of the way of the needle without being damaged. The lumbar cistern extends into the sacrum up to the S2 vertebra.

=== Procedure ===
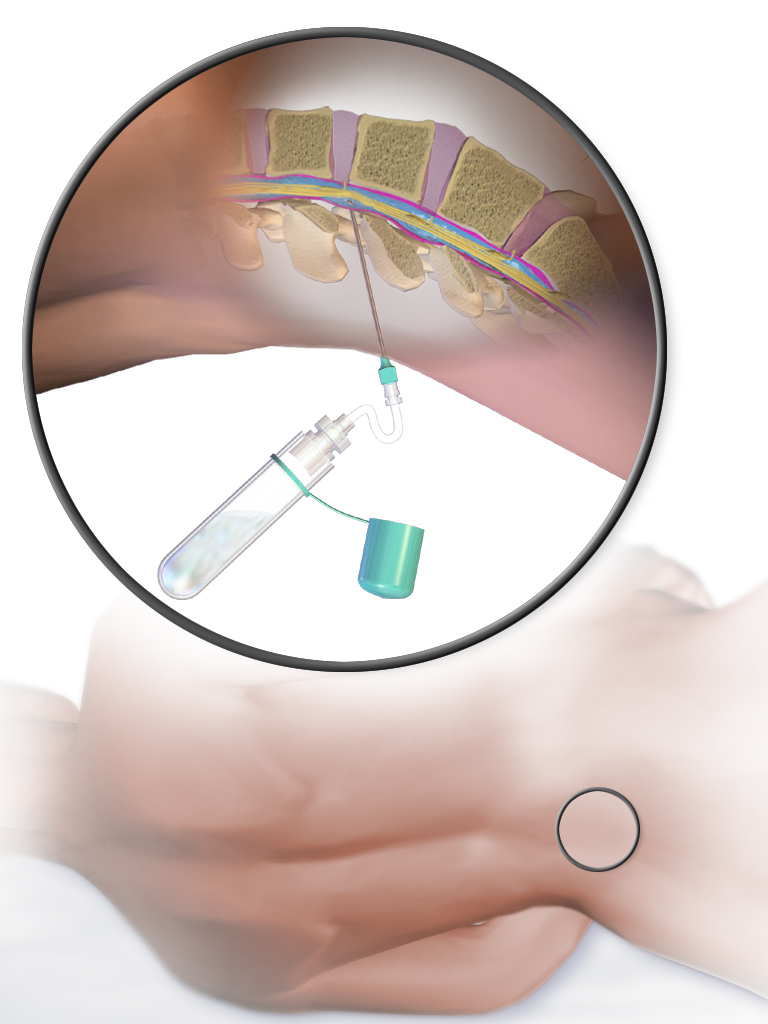
Illustration depicting lumbar puncture (spinal tap)

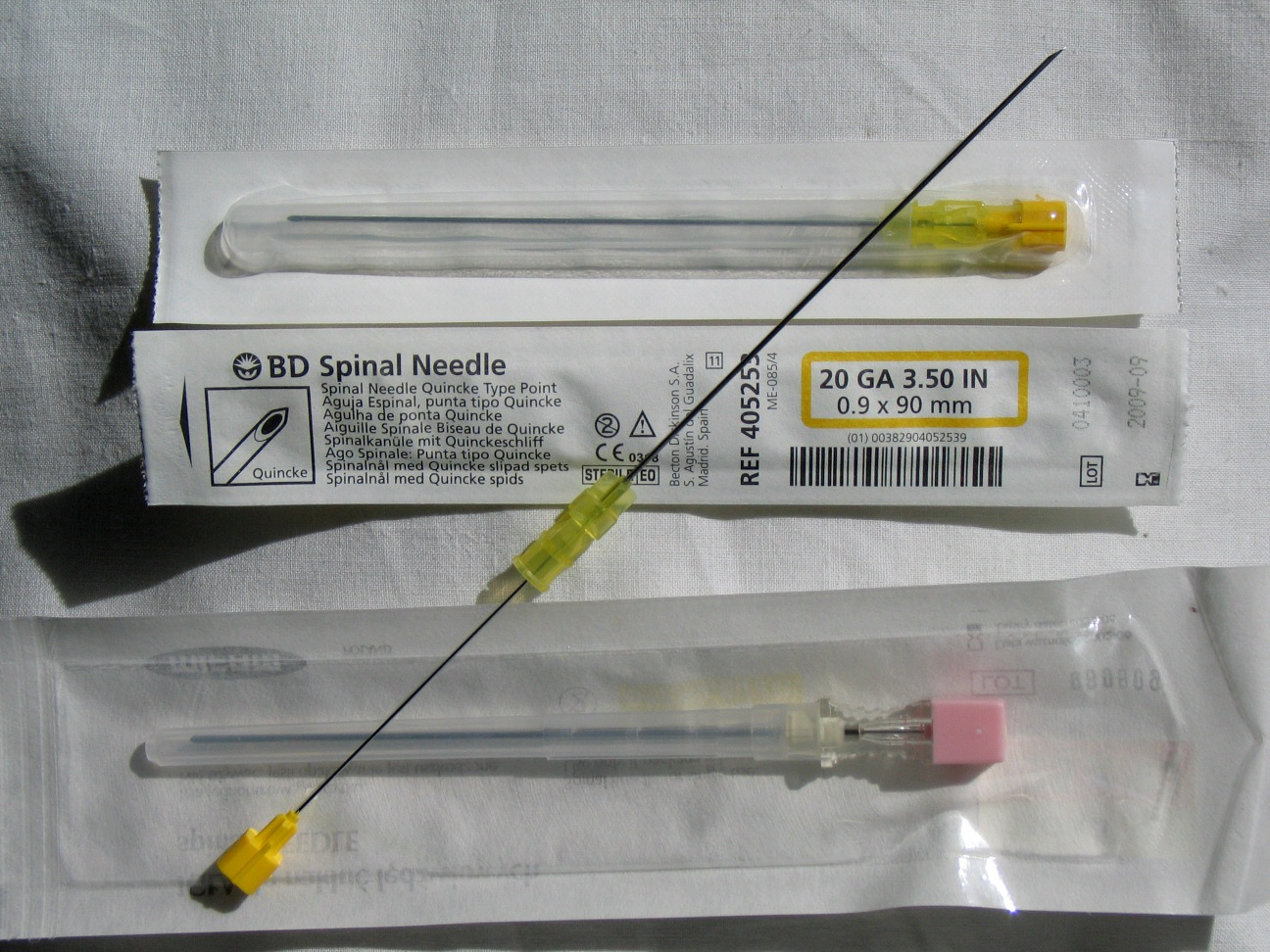
Spinal needles used in lumbar puncture

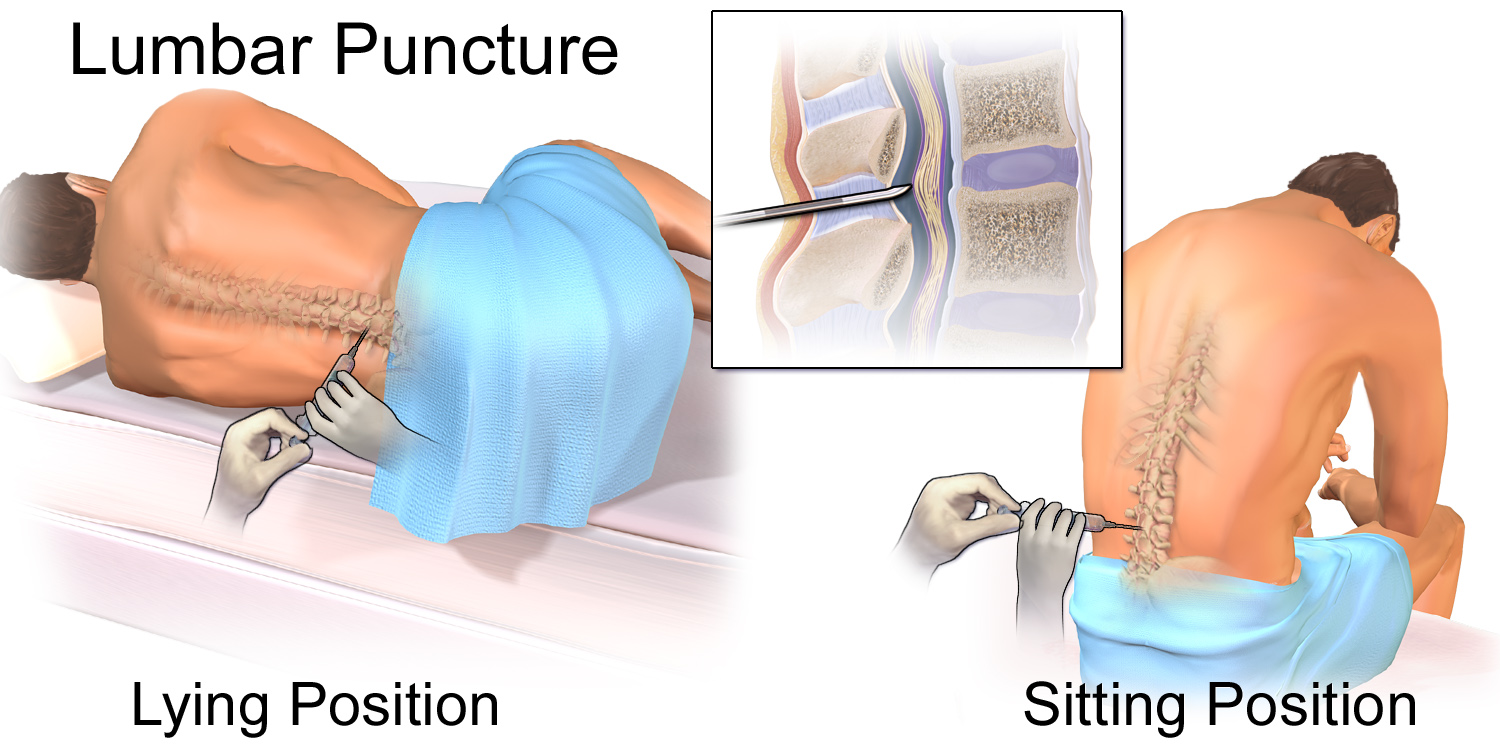
Illustration depicting common positions for lumbar puncture procedure

The person is usually placed on their side (left more commonly than right). The patient bends the neck so the chin is close to the chest, hunches the back, and brings knees toward the chest. This approximates a fetal position as much as possible. Patients may also sit on a stool and bend their head and shoulders forward. The area around the lower back is prepared using aseptic technique. Once the appropriate location is palpated, local anaesthetic is infiltrated under the skin and then injected along the intended path of the spinal needle. A spinal needle is inserted between the lumbar vertebrae L3/L4, L4/L5 or L5/S1 and pushed in until there is a "give" as it pierces the ligamentum flavum and enters the epidural space. The needle is again pushed until there is a second 'give' that indicates the needle is now past the dura mater and within the lumbar cistern. The arachnoid membrane and the dura mater exist in flush contact with one another in the living person's spine due to fluid pressure from CSF in the subarachnoid space pushing the arachnoid membrane out towards the dura. Therefore, once the needle has pierced the dura mater it has also traversed the thinner arachnoid membrane. The needle is then in the subarachnoid space. The stylet from the spinal needle is then withdrawn and drops of cerebrospinal fluid are collected. The opening pressure of the cerebrospinal fluid may be taken during this collection by using a simple column manometer. The procedure is ended by withdrawing the needle while placing pressure on the puncture site. The spinal level is so selected to avoid spinal injuries. In the past, the patient would lie on their back for at least six hours and be monitored for signs of neurological problems. There is no scientific evidence that this provides any benefit. The technique described is almost identical to that used in spinal anesthesia, except that spinal anesthesia is more often done with the patient in a seated position.

The upright seated position is advantageous in that there is less distortion of spinal anatomy which allows for easier withdrawal of fluid. Some practitioners prefer it for lumbar puncture in obese patients, where lying on their side would cause a scoliosis and unreliable anatomical landmarks. However, opening pressures are notoriously unreliable when measured in the seated position. Therefore, patients will ideally lie on their side if practitioners need to measure opening pressure.

Reinsertion of the stylet may decrease the rate of post lumbar puncture headaches.

Although not available in all clinical settings, use of ultrasound is helpful for visualizing the interspinous space and assessing the depth of the spine from the skin. Use of ultrasound reduces the number of needle insertions and redirections, and results in higher rates of successful lumbar puncture. If the procedure is difficult, such as in people with spinal deformities such as scoliosis, it can also be performed under fluoroscopy (under continuous X-ray imaging).

=== Children ===
In children, a sitting flexed position was as successful as lying on the side with respect to obtaining non-traumatic CSF, CSF for culture, and cell count. There was a higher success rate in obtaining CSF in the first attempt in infants younger than 12 months in the sitting flexed position.

The spine of an infant at the time of birth differs from the adult spine. The conus medullaris (bottom of the spinal cord) terminates at the level of L1 in adults, but may range in term neonates (newly born babies) from L1–L3 levels. It is important to insert the spinal needle below the conus medullaris at the L3/L4 or L4/L5 interspinous levels. With growth of the spine, the conus typically reaches the adult level (L1) by 2 years of age.

The ligamentum flavum and dura mater are not as thick in infants and children as they are in adults. Therefore, it is difficult to assess when the needle passes through them into the subarachnoid space because the characteristic "pop" or "give" may be subtle or nonexistent in the pediatric lumbar puncture. To decrease the chances of inserting the spinal needle too far, some clinicians use the "Cincinnati" method. This method involves removing the stylet of the spinal needle once the needle has advanced through the dermis. After removal of the stylet, the needle is inserted until CSF starts to come out of the needle. Once all of the CSF is collected, the stylet is then reinserted before removal of the needle.

=== Newborn infants ===
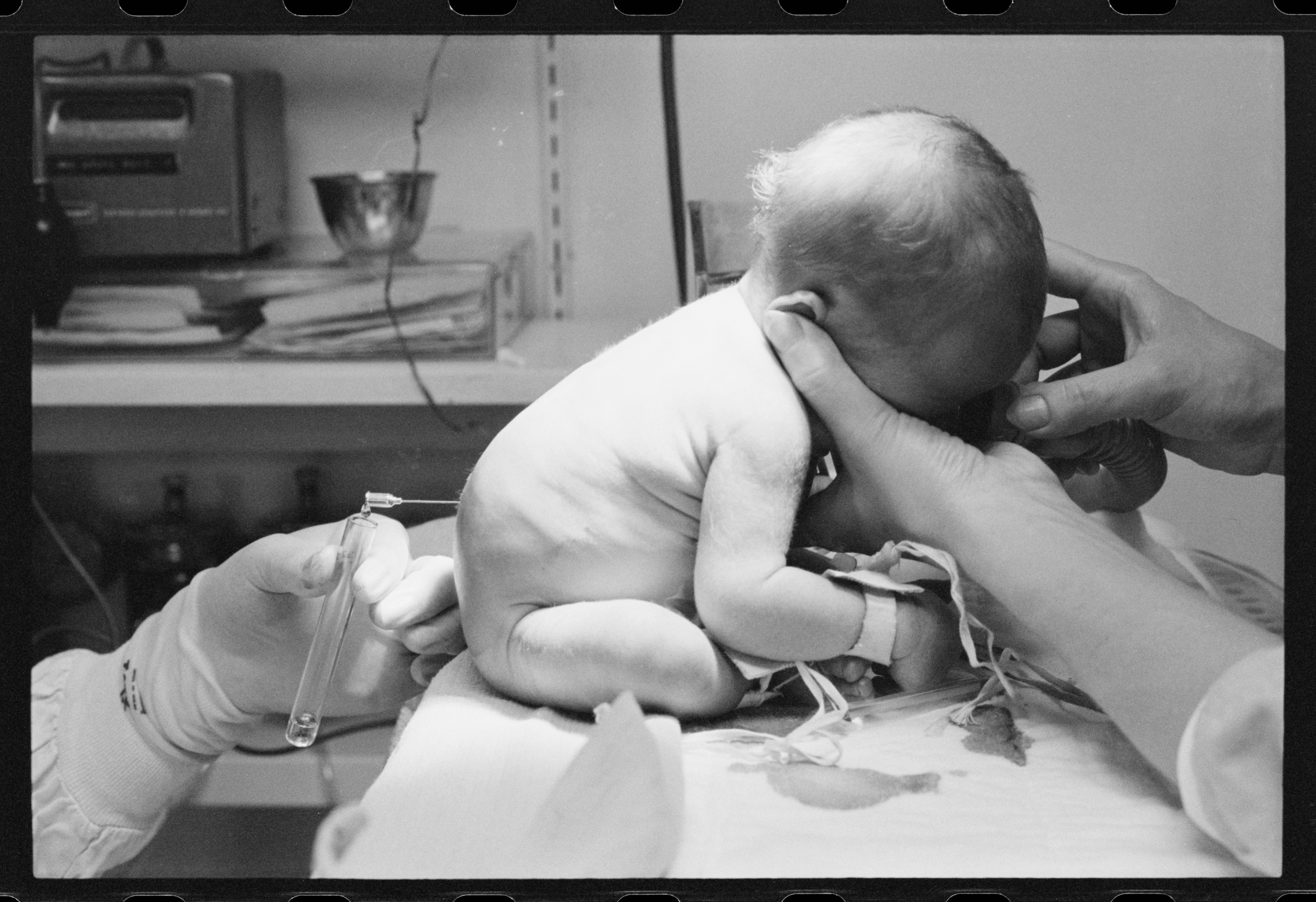
Lumbar puncture being performed on a newborn to detect infection, 1967

Lumbar punctures are often used to diagnose or verify an infection in very young babies and can cause quite a bit of pain unless appropriate pain control is used (analgesia). Managing pain is important for infants undergoing this procedure. Approaches for pain control include topical pain medications (anaesthetics such as lidocaine). The most effective approach for pain control in infants who require a lumbar puncture is not clear.

== Interpretation ==
Analysis of the cerebrospinal fluid generally includes a cell count and determination of the glucose and protein concentrations. The other analytical studies of cerebrospinal fluid are conducted according to the diagnostic suspicion.

=== Specimen handling and transport ===
The CSF specimens must be sent to the laboratory immediately and examined within one hour of collection. In order to prevent cellular degradation, the cell counts should be completed within 30 to 60 minutes, just after the collection of CSF.

Glass tubes are not recommended, as cells can stick to their walls and lead to underestimation of cell numbers. Samples should be drawn into four sterile tubes in the following order, tube 1 for chemistry tests, tube 2 for microbiology, tube 3 for hematology, and tube 4 for cytology or specialized studies to ensure accurate, and uncontaminated results.

For culture purposes, CSF should be stored at room temperature, since refrigeration can inhibit the growth of sensitive organisms such as Haemophilus influenzae and Neisseria meningitidis.

=== Pressure determination ===
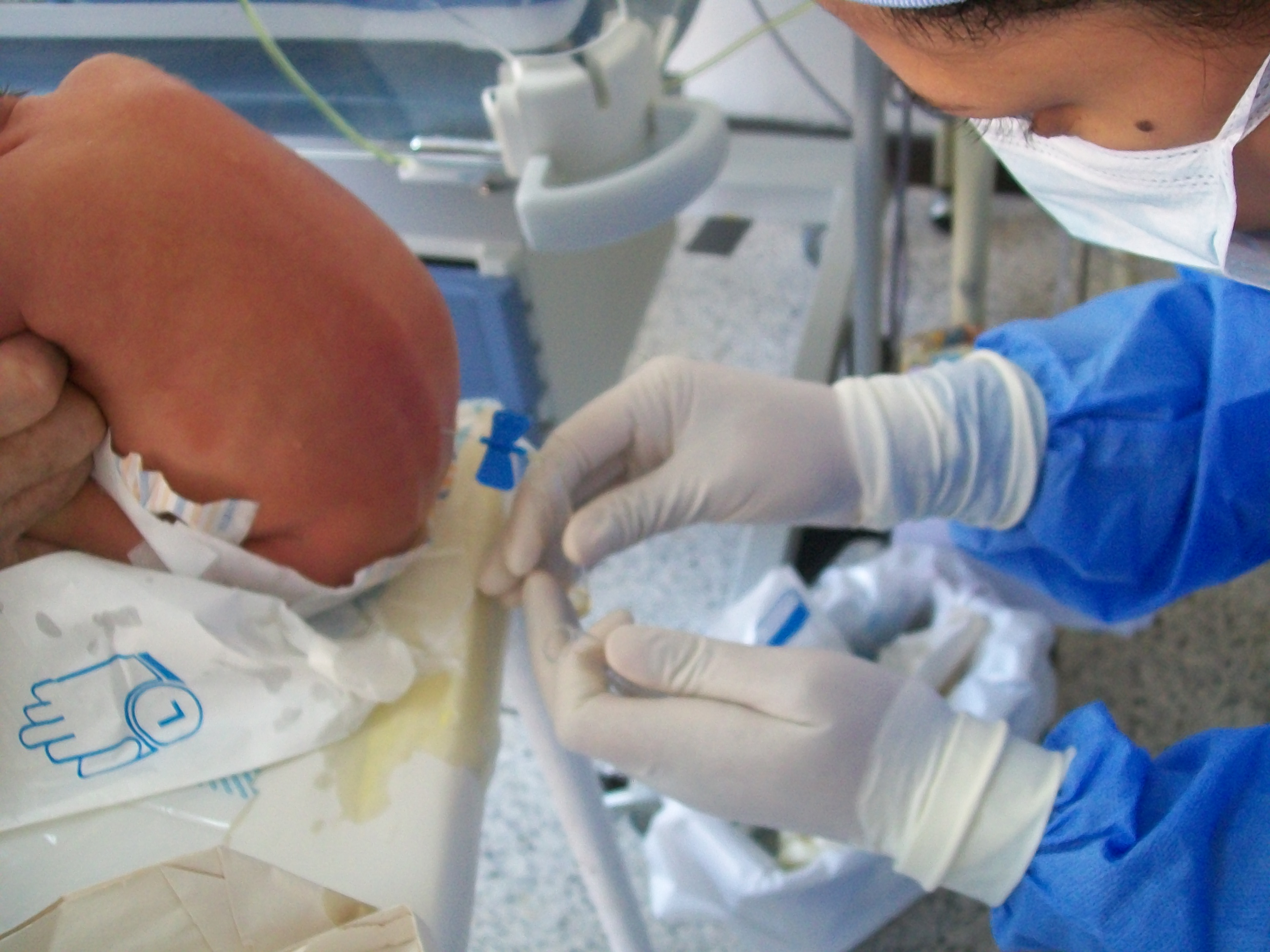
Lumbar puncture in a child suspected of having meningitis

Increased CSF pressure can indicate congestive heart failure, cerebral edema, subarachnoid hemorrhage, hypo-osmolality resulting from hemodialysis, meningeal inflammation, purulent meningitis or tuberculous meningitis, hydrocephalus, or pseudotumor cerebri. In the setting of raised pressure (or normal pressure hydrocephalus, where the pressure is normal but there is excessive CSF), lumbar puncture may be therapeutic.

Decreased CSF pressure can indicate complete subarachnoid blockage, leakage of spinal fluid, severe dehydration, hyperosmolality, or circulatory collapse. Significant changes in pressure during the procedure can indicate tumors or spinal blockage resulting in a large pool of CSF, or hydrocephalus associated with large volumes of CSF.

=== Cell count ===
The presence of white blood cells in cerebrospinal fluid is called pleocytosis. A small number of monocytes can be normal; the presence of granulocytes is always an abnormal finding. A large number of granulocytes often heralds bacterial meningitis. White cells can also indicate reaction to repeated lumbar punctures, reactions to prior injections of medicines or dyes, central nervous system hemorrhage, leukemia, recent epileptic seizure, or a metastatic tumor. When peripheral blood contaminates the withdrawn CSF, a common procedural complication, white blood cells will be present along with erythrocytes, and their ratio will be the same as that in the peripheral blood.

The finding of erythrophagocytosis, where phagocytosed erythrocytes are observed, signifies haemorrhage into the CSF that preceded the lumbar puncture. Therefore, when erythrocytes are detected in the CSF sample, erythrophagocytosis suggests causes other than a traumatic tap, such as intracranial haemorrhage and haemorrhagic herpetic encephalitis. In which case, further investigations are warranted, including imaging and viral culture.

=== Microbiology ===
CSF can be sent to the microbiology lab for various types of smears and cultures to diagnose infections.

- Gram staining may demonstrate gram positive bacteria in bacterial meningitis.
- Microbiological culture is the gold standard for detecting bacterial meningitis. Bacteria, fungi, and viruses can all be cultured by using different techniques.
- Polymerase chain reaction (PCR) has been a great advance in the diagnosis of some types of meningitis, such as meningitis from herpesvirus and enterovirus. It has high sensitivity and specificity for many infections of the CNS, is fast, and can be done with small volumes of CSF. Even though testing is expensive, cost analyses of PCR testing in neonatal patients demonstrated savings via reduced cost of hospitalization.
- Numerous antibody-mediated tests for CSF are available in some countries: these include rapid tests for antigens of common bacterial pathogens, treponemal titers for the diagnosis of neurosyphilis and Lyme disease, Coccidioides antibody, and others.
- The India ink test is still used for detection of meningitis caused by Cryptococcus neoformans, but the cryptococcal antigen (CrAg) test has a higher sensitivity.

=== Chemistry ===
Several substances found in cerebrospinal fluid are available for diagnostic measurement.

- Glucose is present in the CSF; the level is usually about 60% that in the peripheral circulation. A fingerstick or venipuncture at the time of lumbar puncture may therefore be performed to assess peripheral glucose levels and determine a predicted CSF glucose value. Decreased glucose levels can indicate fungal, tuberculous or pyogenic infections; lymphomas; leukemia spreading to the meninges; meningoencephalitic mumps; or hypoglycemia. A glucose level of less than one third of blood glucose levels in association with low CSF lactate levels is typical in hereditary CSF glucose transporter deficiency also known as De Vivo disease.
- Increased glucose levels in the fluid can indicate diabetes, although the 60% rule still applies.
- Increased levels of glutamine are often involved with hepatic encephalopathies, Reye's syndrome, hepatic coma, cirrhosis, hypercapnia and depression.
- Increased levels of lactate can occur the presence of cancer of the CNS, multiple sclerosis, heritable mitochondrial disease, low blood pressure, low serum phosphorus, respiratory alkalosis, idiopathic seizures, traumatic brain injury, cerebral ischemia, brain abscess, hydrocephalus, hypocapnia or bacterial meningitis.
- The enzyme lactate dehydrogenase can be measured to help distinguish meningitides of bacterial origin, which are often associated with high levels of the enzyme, from those of viral origin in which the enzyme is low or absent.
- Changes in total protein content of cerebrospinal fluid can result from pathologically increased permeability of the blood-cerebrospinal fluid barrier, obstructions of CSF circulation, meningitis, neurosyphilis, brain abscesses, subarachnoid hemorrhage, polio, collagen disease or Guillain–Barré syndrome, leakage of CSF, increases in intracranial pressure, or hyperthyroidism. Very high levels of protein may indicate tuberculous meningitis or spinal block.
- IgG synthetic rate is calculated from measured IgG and total protein levels; it is elevated in immune disorders such as multiple sclerosis, transverse myelitis, and neuromyelitis optica of Devic. Oligoclonal bands may be detected in CSF but not in serum, suggesting intrathecal antibody production.
- Measurement of cerebrospinal fluid orexin (hypocretin) levels obtained via lumbar puncture can aid in the diagnosis of narcolepsy type 1, where orexin levels are typically low or absent.

| Infection | Appearance | WBCs / mm^{3} | Protein (g/L) | Glucose |
|---|---|---|---|---|
| Normal | Clear | <5 | 0.15 to 0.45 | > 2/3 of blood glucose |
| Bacterial | Yellowish, turbid | > 1,000 (mostly PMNs) | > 1 | Low |
| Viral | Clear | < 200 (mostly lymphocytes) | Mild increase | Normal or mildly low |
| Tuberculosis | Yellowish and viscous | Modest increase | Markedly Increased | Decreased |
| Fungal | Yellowish and viscous | < 50 (mostly lymphocytes) | Initially normal, then increased | Normal or mildly low |

== History ==
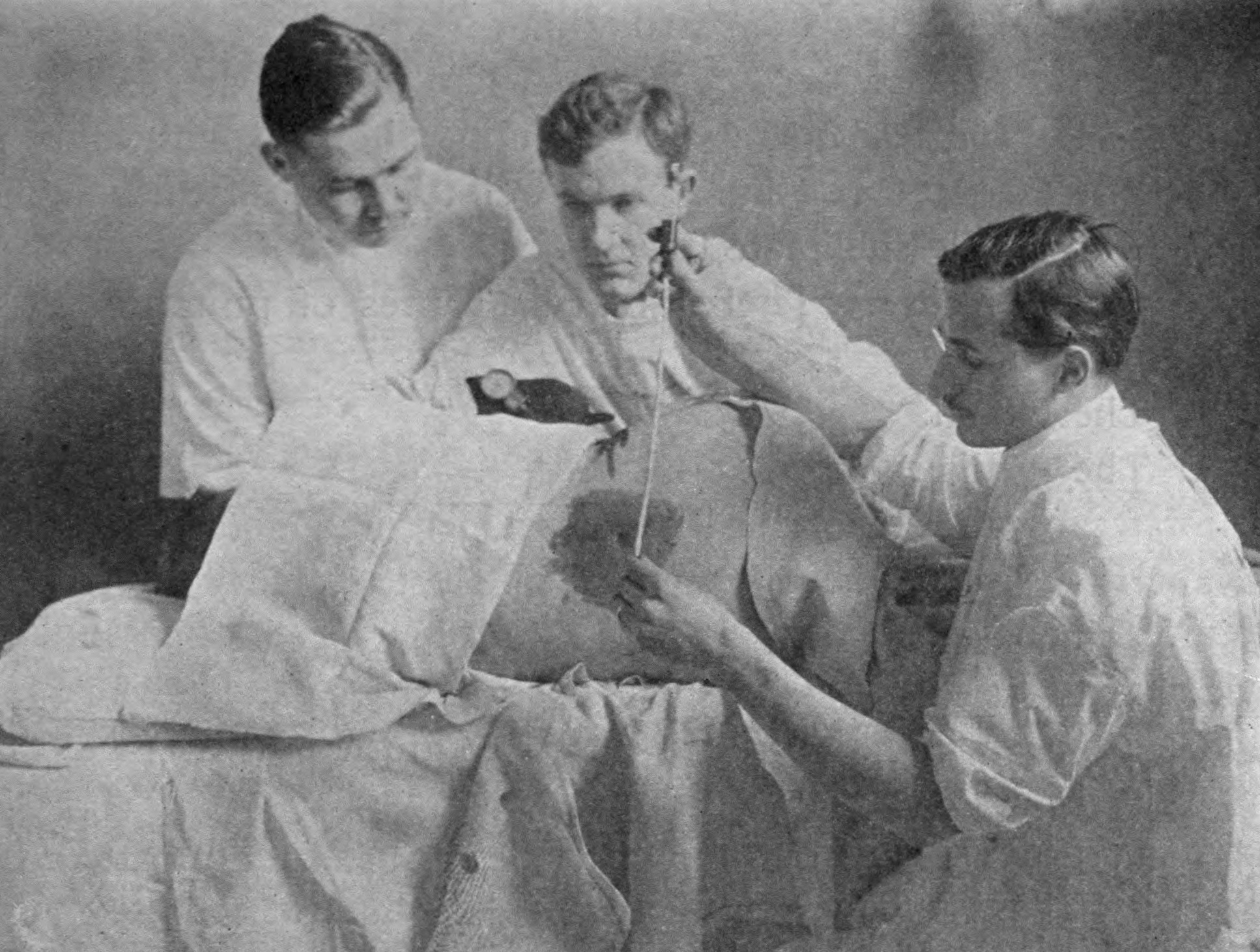
Lumbar puncture, early 20th century

The first technique for accessing the dural space was described by the London physician Walter Essex Wynter. In 1889 he developed a crude cut down with cannulation in four patients with tuberculous meningitis. The main purpose was the treatment of raised intracranial pressure rather than for diagnosis. The technique for needle lumbar puncture was then introduced by the German physician Heinrich Quincke, who credits Wynter with the earlier discovery; he first reported his experiences at an internal medicine conference in Wiesbaden, Germany, in 1891. He subsequently published a book on the subject.

The lumbar puncture procedure was taken to the United States by Arthur H. Wentworth an assistant professor at the Harvard Medical School, based at Children's Hospital. In 1893 he published a long paper on diagnosing cerebrospinal meningitis by examining spinal fluid. However, he was criticized by antivivisectionists for having obtained spinal fluid from children. He was acquitted, but, nevertheless, he was uninvited from the then forming Johns Hopkins School of Medicine, where he would have been the first professor of pediatrics.

Historically lumbar punctures were also employed in the process of performing a pneumoencephalography, a nowadays obsolete X-ray imaging study of the brain that was performed extensively from the 1920s until the advent of modern non-invasive neuroimaging techniques such as MRI and CT in the 1970s. During this quite painful procedure, CSF was replaced with air or some other gas via the lumbar puncture in order to enhance the appearance of certain areas of the brain on plain radiographs.

== See also ==
- Spinal anaesthesia
- Epidural administration
- Intrathecal administration
