= Conservative treatment =

Medical treatment that avoids invasive measures

Conservative treatment is a type of medical treatment defined by the avoidance of invasive procedures, such as surgery, usually with the intent to preserve function or body parts, maintain quality of life, or avoid the risk of complications from surgery. The effectiveness of a conservative treatment plan depends on patient/provider goals as well as the stage and type of disease or injury.

== Effectiveness of conservative treatment ==
=== Kidney failure ===
In patients with advanced kidney failure, Conservative Kidney Management (CKM), or Comprehensive Conservative Care (CCC), is an alternative to dialysis or transplant. CKM includes management of pain and other symptoms, nutrition, and preservation of kidney function through noninvasive methods with an emphasis on quality of life. Studies of treatment strategies among elderly patients show that while more aggressive treatments such as dialysis may increase life expectancy, this effect diminishes among patients over 80, while patients who choose conservative treatment report a higher quality of life. One barrier to establishing strong provider-patient communication about CKM is disagreement among providers over the specific terms used, including "conservative treatment," "conservative care," "supportive care," "palliative care," "Conservative Kidney Management," and "Comprehensive Conservative Care."

=== Appendicitis ===
Conservative treatment of acute appendicitis has been attempted with mixed results. Across all ages, patients who received antibiotic therapy had one-year recurrence rates of 13%-38%. Most patients who attempted a second round of antibiotic therapy eventually required surgical treatment.

The overwhelming of hospitals during the COVID-19 pandemic led some providers to shift from immediate surgical treatment of acute appendicitis to antibiotic therapy in pediatric patients. In studies of uncomplicated cases of pediatric appendicitis, nonoperative management was inferior to operative management (surgery), resulting in significantly higher rates of failure initially, after one year, and overall. These patients were also more likely to experience adverse advents and rehospitalization. Though some carefully selected patients may benefit from this therapy, surgery remains the standard treatment strategy.

=== Cancer ===
Standard treatment for endometrial cancer is total hysterectomy. Conservative therapy for patients with endometrial atypical hyperplasia or low grade early stage endometrial cancer involves hysteroscopic resection followed by hormone therapy. This treatment has been shown to be safe and effective in specific types of low-risk patients who wish to preserve their fertility.

Standard treatment for ductal carcinoma in situ of the breast is surgical resection. In low-risk cases detected through screening, patients who received active surveillance experienced similar 5 and 10-year outcomes as patients who received surgical treatment.
