= Beta-2 transferrin =

Protein found in cerebrospinal fluid

Beta-2 transferrin is a carbohydrate-free (desialated) isoform of transferrin, which is almost exclusively found in the cerebrospinal fluid. It is not found in blood, mucus or tears, thus making it a specific marker of cerebrospinal fluid, applied as an assay in cases where cerebrospinal fluid leakage is suspected.

Beta-2 transferrin would also be positive in patients with perilymph fluid leaks, as it is also present in inner ear perilymph. Thus, beta-2 transferrin in otorrhea would be suggestive of either a CSF leak or a perilymph leak.
