= Post-dural-puncture headache =

Common side effect of lumbar puncture or spinal anaesthesia

- Other names: Post-spinal-puncture headache, post-lumbar-puncture headache, spinal headache, epidural headache, low-pressure headache
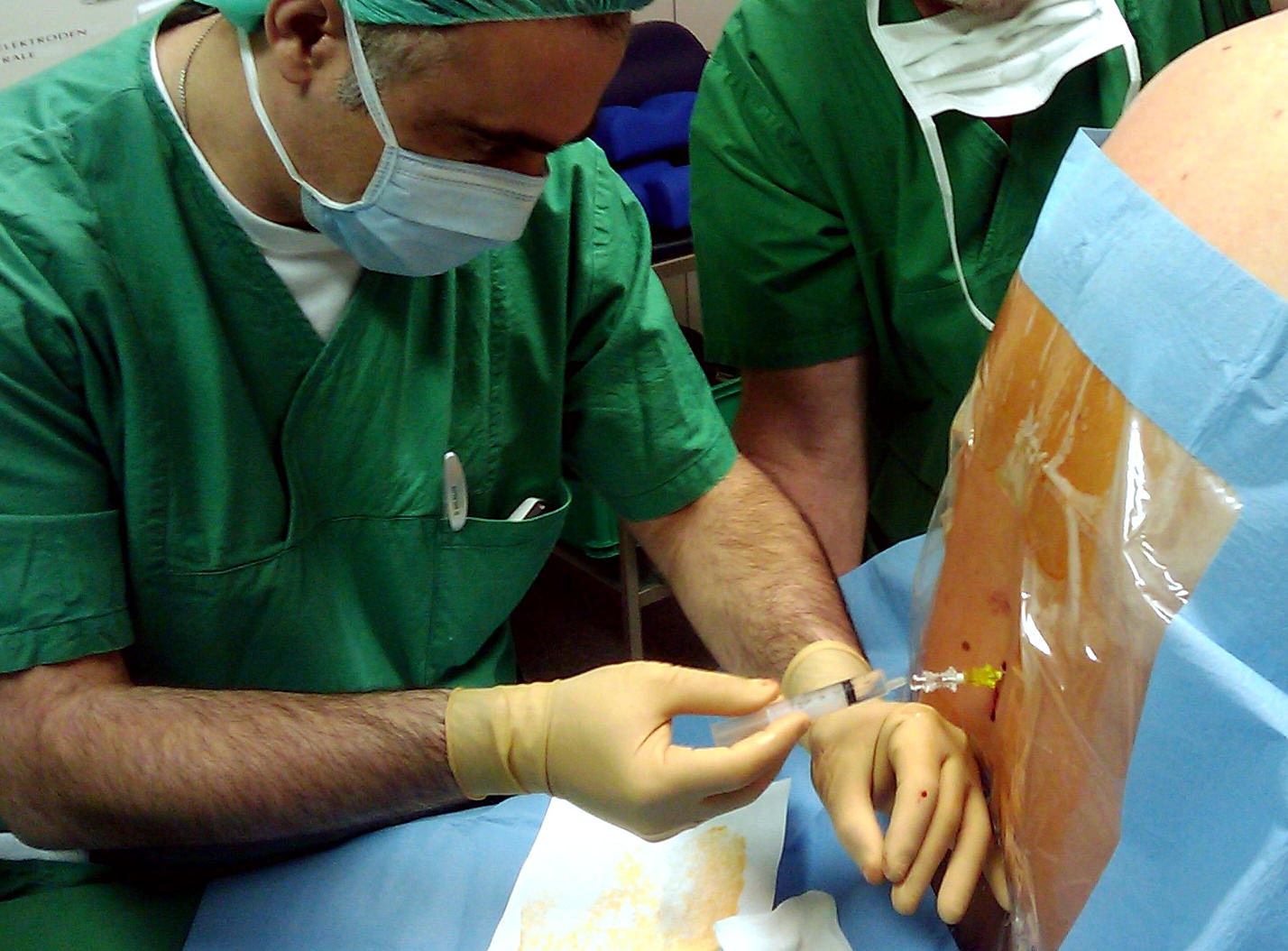
- PDPH is a common side effect of spinal anaesthesia (pictured).
- Specialty: Anaesthesiology

Post-dural-puncture headache (PDPH) is a complication of puncture of the dura mater (one of the membranes around the brain and spinal cord). The headache is severe and described as "searing and spreading like hot metal", involving the back and front of the head and spreading to the neck and shoulders, sometimes involving neck stiffness. It is exacerbated by movement and sitting or standing and is relieved to some degree by lying down. Nausea, vomiting, pain in arms and legs, hearing loss, tinnitus, vertigo, dizziness and paraesthesia of the scalp are also common.

PDPH is a common side effect of lumbar puncture and spinal anesthesia. Leakage of cerebrospinal fluid causes reduced fluid pressure in the brain and spinal cord. Onset occurs within two days in 66% of cases and three days in 90%. It occurs so rarely immediately after puncture that other possible causes should be investigated when it does.

Using a pencil-point needle rather than a cutting spinal needle decreases the risk of developing PDPH. Smaller needle gauges decrease the odds of PDPH, but make it more challenging to perform the procedure successfully. The needle with the lowest PDPH rate and highest succession rate is the 26G pencil-point needle. Its estimated PDPH rate is between 2% and 10%.

== Signs and symptoms ==
PDPH typically occurs hours to days after puncture and presents with symptoms such as headache (which is mostly bi-frontal or occipital) and nausea that typically worsen when the patient assumes an upright posture. The headache usually occurs 24–48 hours after puncture but may occur as many as 12 days after. It usually resolves within a few days but has been rarely documented to take much longer.

== Pathophysiology ==
PDPH is thought to result from a loss of cerebrospinal fluid into the epidural space. A decreased hydrostatic pressure in the subarachnoid space then leads to traction to the meninges with associated symptoms.

== Diagnosis ==
=== Differential diagnosis ===
Although in very rare cases the headache may present immediately after a puncture, this is almost always due to another cause such as increased intracranial pressure and requires immediate attention.

== Prevention ==
Using a pencil point rather than a cutting spinal needle decreases the risk. The size of the pencil point needle does not appear to make a difference, while smaller cutting needles have a low risk compared to larger ones. Modern, atraumatic needles such as the Sprotte or Whitacre spinal needle leave a smaller perforation and reduce the risk for PDPH. However, the evidence that atraumatic needles reduce the risk of post-dural puncture headache (PDPH) without increasing adverse events such as paraesthesia or backache is moderate-quality and further research should be done.

Morphine, cosyntropin, and aminophylline appear effective in reducing post dural puncture headaches. Evidence does not support the use of bed rest or intravenous fluids to prevent PDPH.

== Treatment ==
Some people require no other treatment than pain medications and bed rest. A 2015 review found tentative evidence to support the use of caffeine. Vigorous hydration is routinely encouraged in postpartum patients.

Pharmacological treatments as; gabapentin, pregabalin, neostigmine/atropine, methylxanthines, and triptans. Minimally invasive procedures as; bilateral greater occipital nerve block or sphenopalatine ganglion block.

Persistent and severe PDPH may require an epidural blood patch (EBP). A small amount of the person's blood is injected into the epidural space near the site of the original puncture; the resulting blood clot then "patches" the meningeal leak.

EBP is effective, and further intervention is rarely necessary. 25–35% of patients suffer from transient back pain after EBP. More rare complications of EBP include misplacement of blood leading to spinal subdural hematoma or intrathecal injection and arachnoiditis, infection with subdural abscess, facial nerve paralysis, spastic paraparesis and cauda equina syndrome.

== Epidemiology ==
Estimates for the overall incidence of PDPH vary between 0.1% and 36%. It is more common in younger patients (especially in the 18–30 age group), women (especially those who are pregnant), and those with a low body mass index (BMI). The low prevalence in elderly patients may be due to a less stretchable dura mater. It is also more common with the use of larger diameter needles. A 2006 review reported an incidence of:

- 12% if a needle between 0.4128 mm (0.01625 in) and 0.5652 mm (0.02225 in) is used;
- 40% if a needle between 0.7176 mm (0.02825 in) and 0.9081 mm (0.03575 in) is used; and
- 70% if a needle between 1.067 mm (0.0420 in) and 1.651 mm (0.0650 in) is used.

On the Birmingham gauge, these correspond to the values 27–24G, 22–20G and 19–16G.

PDPH is roughly twice as common in lumbar puncture than spinal anaesthesia, almost certainly due to the atraumatic needles used in spinal anaesthesia.
