= Pseudomeningocele =

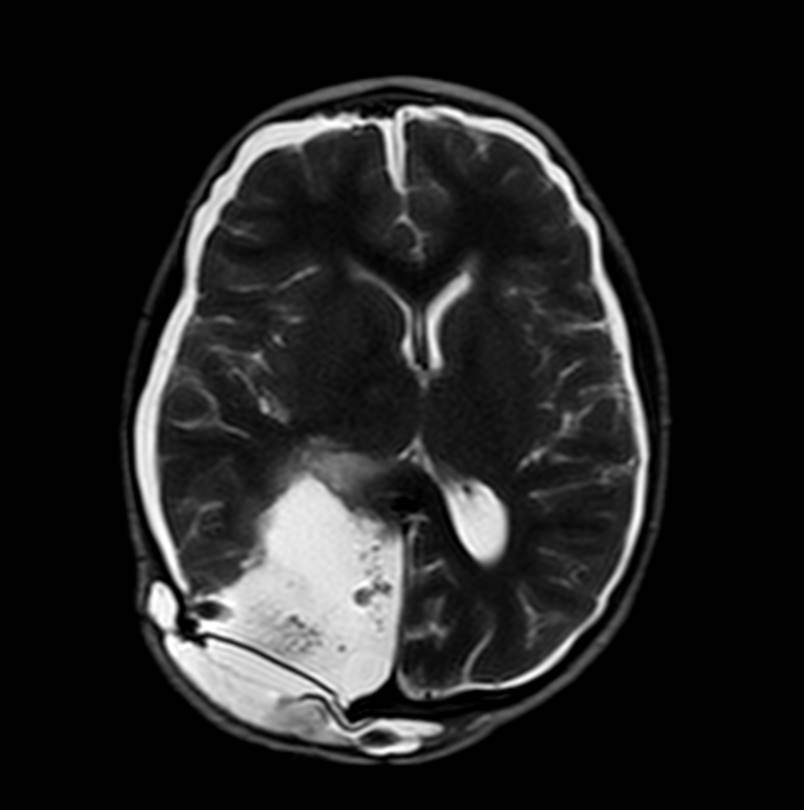
- MRI of Pseudomeningocele in 8 years old male patient
- Specialty: Neurosurgery

A pseudomeningocele is an abnormal collection of cerebrospinal fluid (CSF) that communicates with the CSF space around the brain or spinal cord. In contrast to a meningocele, in which the fluid is surrounded and confined by dura mater, in a pseudomeningocele, the fluid has no surrounding membrane, but is contained in a cavity within the soft tissues.

Pseudomeningocele may result after brain surgery, spine surgery, or brachial plexus avulsion injury.

Treatment for pseudomeningocele is conservative or may involve neurosurgical repair.
