= Fibrin glue =

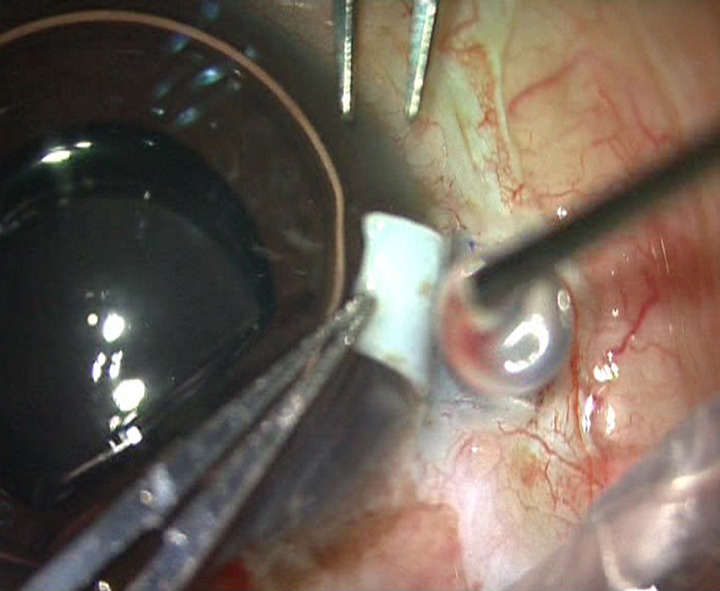
- Fibrin glue applied after drying the scleral bed in an intraocular lens operation

Combination of
- Fibrinogen: Glycoprotein
- Thrombin: Coagulation factor

Clinical data
- Trade names: Artiss, Evicel, Tisseel, others
- AHFS/Drugs.com: Professional Drug Facts
- License data: US DailyMed: Fibrinogen
- Pregnancy category: AU: B2
- Routes of administration: Topical
- ATC code: B02BC30 (WHO)

Legal status
- Legal status: AU: S4 (Prescription only); CA: ℞-only / Schedule D; UK: POM (Prescription only); US: ℞-only; EU: Rx-only; In general: ℞ (Prescription only)

Identifiers
- KEGG: D12591

Fibrin glue (also called fibrin sealant) is a surgical formulation used to create a fibrin clot for hemostasis, cartilage repair surgeries or wound healing. It contains separately packaged human fibrinogen and human thrombin.

== Medical uses ==
This glue is used as a supportive treatment in surgery (such as liver surgery) for the improvement of hemostasis where standard surgical techniques are insufficient or impractical.

It is also used for repairing dura mater tears and bronchial fistulas and for achieving hemostasis after spleen and liver trauma, in "no sutures" corneal transplantation, pterygium excision with amniotic membrane or conjunctival autograft, and in eye trauma for corneal or conjunctival defects, as well as for skin graft donor site wounds to reduce postoperative pain.

It can also be used to treat pilonidal sinus disease but it is of unclear benefit as of 2017, due to insufficient research.

== Contraindications ==
The glue must not get into blood vessels, as this could lead to clotting in the form of thromboembolism or disseminated intravascular coagulation, or to anaphylaxis (a severe allergic reaction).

== Side effects ==
Possible adverse effects include bleeding disorder and allergic reactions such as flushing, stinging, generalised urticaria, angioedema, bronchospasm, and anaphylaxis. Other adverse effects in studies occurred in roughly equal proportions in treatment and placebo groups.

== Interactions ==
As fibrin glue contains proteins, it may be denatured by ethanol, iodine and heavy metals. These substances are frequently found in antiseptic solutions.

== Pharmacology ==
=== Mechanism of action ===
Thrombin is an enzyme that splits fibrinogen into fibrin monomers in 10 to 60 seconds, which aggregate to form a three-dimensional gel-like structure. Thrombin also activates factor XIII from the human body to factor XIIIa, which then cross-links the fibrin monomers to form a stable clot. Both these processes need calcium to work. As the wound heals, the clot is slowly degraded by the enzyme plasmin.

=== Pharmacokinetics ===
In rabbit studies, only 1 to 2% of the applied thrombin dose reached the bloodstream. It reached highest blood plasma concentrations after 6 to 8 hours.

== Chemistry ==
=== Composition ===
Fibrin glue comes in two vials, respectively containing:

- fibrinogen: lyophilised pooled human concentrate
- thrombin: This used to be of bovine origin; modern formulations contain human thrombin.

The two components are mixed immediately before application. The formulations also contain calcium salts.

Formulations from different manufacturers may also contain aprotinin, fibronectin, plasminogen, and factor XIII.

== Legal status ==
A formulation with human thrombin was approved for medical use in the United States in March 2003, and in the European Union in October 2008.
