= Bobblehead =

Doll with a large head on a spring

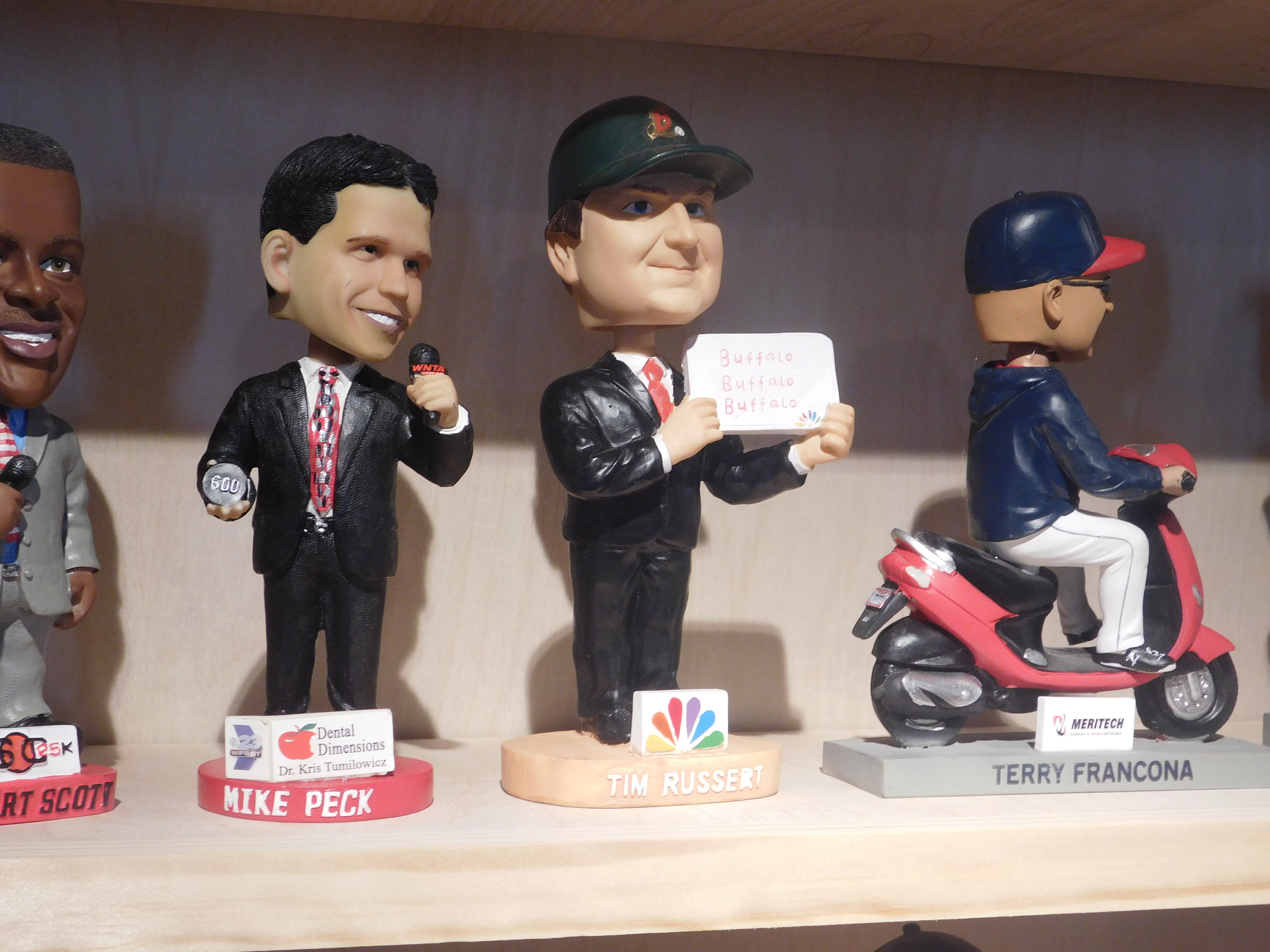
Bobblehead figures

A bobblehead, also known by nicknames such as nodder, nodding dog, wobbler, or wacky wobbler, is a type of small collectible figurine. Its head is often oversized compared to its body. Instead of a solid connection, its head is connected to the body by a spring or hook in such a way that a light tap will cause the head to move around, or "bobble", hence the name.

== History ==
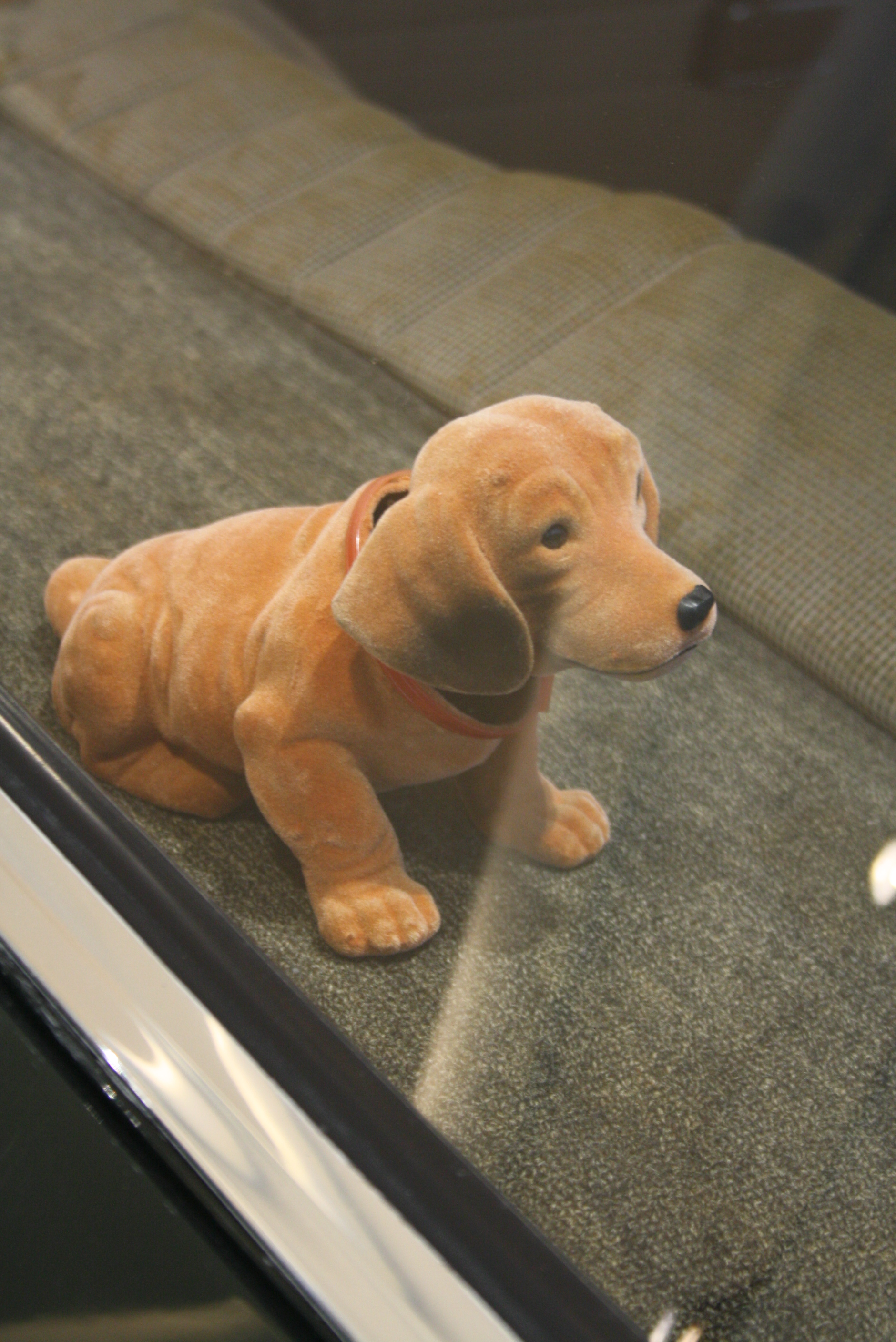
German Wackeldackel, English bobblehead dachshund, Dutch waggel(y) teckel

During the 17th century, figurines of Buddha and other religious figures called "temple nodders" were produced in Asia. The earliest known Western reference to a bobblehead is thought to be in Nikolai Gogol's 1842 short story "The Overcoat", in which the main character's neck was described as being "like the necks of plaster cats that wag their heads". During the nineteenth century, bisque porcelain bobbleheads were made in limited quantities for the US market. Many of the bobbleheads in the US were produced in Germany, with an increase in imports during the 1920s and 1930s. By the 1950s, bobbleheads had a substantial surge in popularity, with items made of either plastic or bisque porcelain.

By 1960, Major League Baseball (MLB) produced a series of papier-mâché bobblehead dolls, one for each team, all with the same cherubic face, and a few select players over time. The World Series held that year brought the first player-specific baseball bobbleheads, for Roberto Clemente, Mickey Mantle, Roger Maris, and Willie Mays, still all with the same face. Over the next decade, bobbleheads were also made of ceramic. Within a few years, they would be produced for other sports as well as cartoon characters. One of the most famous bobbleheads of all time also hails from this era, The Beatles' bobblehead set, which is a valuable collectible today.

The subsequent increase in popularity was in the late 1990s. Although older bobbleheads such as the baseball teams and the Beatles were sought after by collectors during this period, new bobblehead dolls were uncommon. Prompting their resurgence were cheaper manufacturing processes, and the primary bobblehead material was switched, this time from ceramic to plastic. Making bobbleheads in the limited numbers necessary to become viable collectibles was now possible. On 2 August 1997, the Birmingham Barons gave away the Barons bobblehead doll bobbleheads at a game. The first MLB team to offer a bobblehead giveaway was the San Francisco Giants, which distributed 35,000 Willie Mays head-nodders at their 9 May 1999 game.

The variety of bobbleheads has grown to include even relatively obscure pop-culture figures and notable people. The new millennium brought a new type of bobblehead toy. This mini-bobblehead was 5.1–7.6 cm (2–3 in) tall and used for gifts in some packaged foods. Post Cereals packaged 22 million mini-bobbleheads of MLB players with its cereal until its opening day in 2002.

On 18 November 2014, it was announced that the National Bobblehead Hall of Fame and Museum would open in 2016 with a preview exhibit at RedLine Milwaukee from 7 January 2016, to 30 April 2016, which showcased the largest public display of bobbleheads in history. The aughts also saw the rise of a competitive market for personalized, on-demand bobbleheads, typically 15–18 cm (6–7 in) tall, from several online vendors. In 2015, the Pope Francis bobblehead became so popular that a nationwide shortage was reported.

The inaugural National Bobblehead Day in the United States 7 January 2015. In 2016, the Guinness Book of World Records mark for the world's largest bobblehead was set at 4.67 metres (15 ft 4 in) tall. Named "Goldie", St. Bernard, the mascot of Applied Underwriters, was designed by Nate Wells, and constructed by Dino Rentos and the owners of bobbleheads.com.

=== Thanjavur dolls of India ===
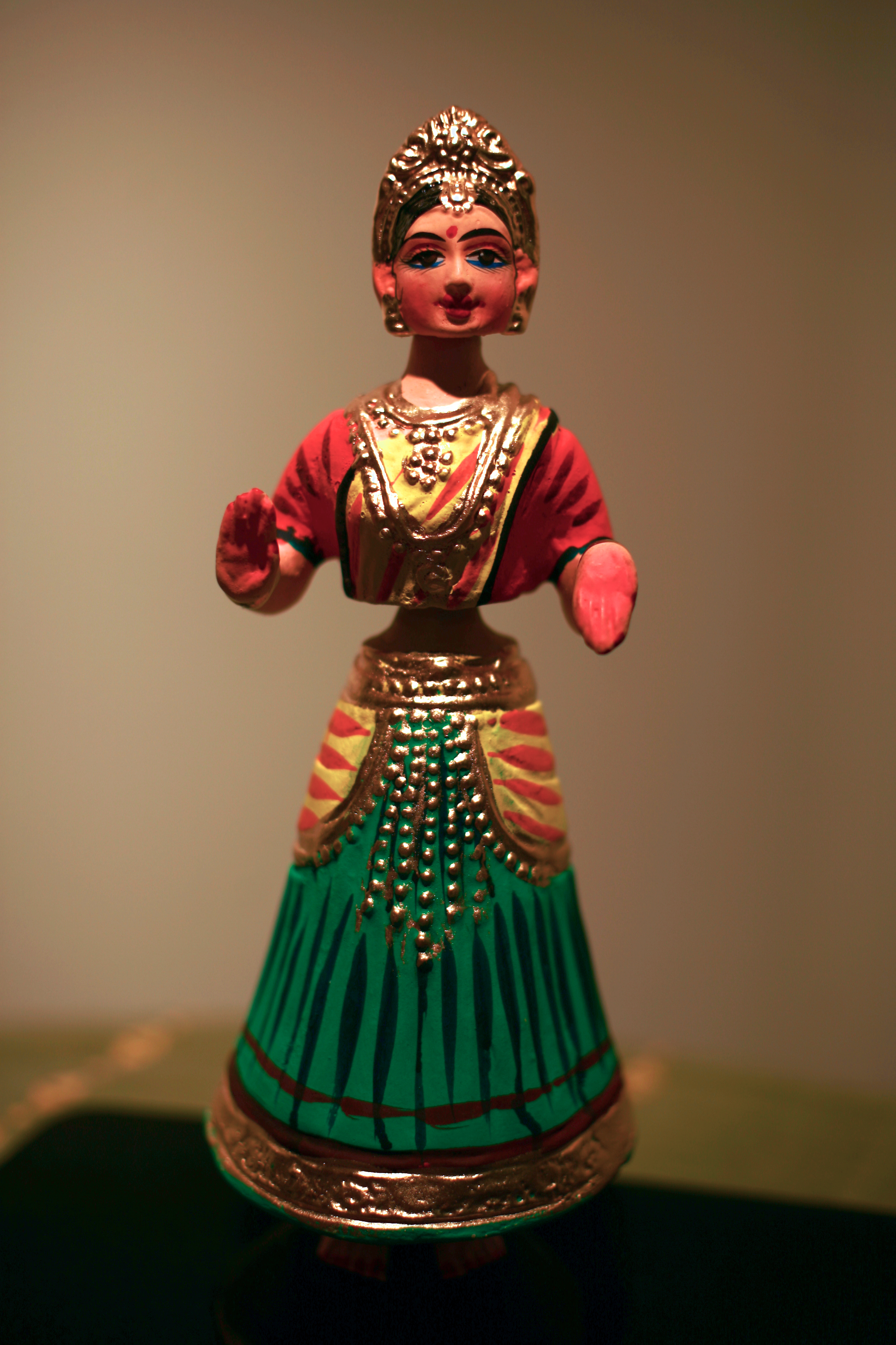
Thanjavur bobblehead doll

Thanjavur dolls are a type of Indian bobblehead doll known as "Thanjavur Thalayatti Bommai" in the Tamil language, meaning "Tanjore Head-Shaking Doll". They are a native art form in the Thanjavur region of Tamil Nadu. These dolls are usually 15 to 30 cm (5.9 to 11.8 in) tall. They are made of clay or wood and painted over in bright colors, and they are often dressed up in fancy clothes. They form part of an elaborate display of dolls known as "Golu (kolu)", exhibited in Indian houses during the "Dasara (Navaratri)" festival in September-October. These dolls are examples of how to start separating the movements of three distinct parts of the body, namely the head, torso, and hip and skirt parts.

A different version of these, 'Thalayatti Bommai', is the king and queen versions. The purpose is to show that the semi-circular bottoms, filled with sands, do not topple with a structure that is sharply raised, a mode that is used in building the Thanjavur Peruvudaiyar Kovil. The recent excavations near the temple's walls show bases filled with sands of different colors, indicating that the temple's architecture has much more planning than the simple stacking of heavy stones.

== In popular culture ==
- Sports teams sometimes give away bobblehead dolls at their games; for example, the Los Angeles Kings gave away bobbleheads commemorating Luc Robitaille's induction into the Hockey Hall of Fame.
- In the 1986 "Let's Go Mets" music video, there is a scene where Joe Piscopo, standing outside the New York Mets' dugout at Shea Stadium, taps four Mets bobblehead dolls, then goes into the dugout and taps the heads of four actual Mets players (Howard Johnson, Bob Ojeda, Rick Aguilera, and Kevin Mitchell), who "bobble" their heads in a similar fashion. Piscopo then attempts to tap a fifth player (Lee Mazzilli) but is rebuffed and subsequently tackled by all of the players.
- In 2001, Audi broadcasts commercials in Europe featuring an Elvis impersonator and a prototypical Wackel-Elvis ("Wobble Elvis" or "Wobbly Elvis") dashboard figure with a wobbling left arm and hip. Due to subsequent demand, 165,000 Wackel-Elvis dashboard figures were produced. The figure depicts Elvis wearing the jumpsuit he wore in the 1973 Aloha from Hawaii TV broadcast.
- Since 2003, law journal The Green Bag has issued bobblehead dolls depicting Justices of the Supreme Court of the United States, both past and present.
- In the second-season episode "Valentine's Day" of NBC's The Office, Dwight Schrute is given a bobblehead doll of himself by Angela Martin as a Valentine's Day gift.
- In 2010, 14-year-old Henry Ermer of Brooklyn, New York, attempted to enter the Guinness Book of World Records by building what is believed to be the world's largest bobblehead, standing 5 m (16 ft) tall.
- On the 2012 season premiere episode of ABC's The Bachelorette, contestant Chris Bukowski presented bachelorette Emily Maynard with custom bobbleheads of the two of them in an attempt to impress her and further himself in the competition.
- Bobbleheads are also a known characteristic feature of the video-game Fallout series.
- Boy from the CBBC animated series Boy Girl Dog Cat Mouse Cheese is seen in various episodes as having an extensive bobblehead collection.

=== Promotional merchandise by American corporations ===
- Newsies "Broadway" Bobblehead
- Richardson's e-learning, five-year trade show giveaway.
- Meteorologist Dave Brown, WMC-TV Bobblehead

=== In film ===
- Bobbleheads: The Movie is a 2020 computer-animated comedy film about four bobbleheads who protect their home from two unwelcome relatives while their owners are away for the weekend. The film, written by Karl Geurs, features the voice talent of Brenda Song, Karen Fukuhara, Julian Sands, Khary Payton, Anthony Destefanis, Grey Griffin, Hala Finley, Luke Wilson, Jennifer Coolidge, and Cher. The film was released on 8 December 2020 (in the United States) by Universal 1440 Entertainment, with Threshold Entertainment and Incessant Rain Studios. According to Nvidia marketing, Bobbleheads is notable for being the first animated film completed fully remotely using Nvidia GPUs in a Microsoft Azure hosted cloud pipeline.
- In Are We There Yet? (2005), Satchel Paige Bobblehead (voiced by Tracy Morgan), Nick's (Ice Cube) prized possession, acts as his confidante, and speaks to him through his conscience, giving him dating advice.

== See also ==
- Akabeko
- Bobble-head doll syndrome
- Funko
- Head bobble
- Wackel-Elvis – German-made Elvis dashboard figure that moves
- National Bobblehead Hall of Fame and Museum
- Nohohon Zoku

== Bibliography ==
- Hunter, Tim (2000). Bobbing Head Dolls: 1960–2000. Krause Publications. ISBN 978-0-87341-802-7.
