= List of awards and nominations received by Spin City =

List of awards won by Spin City
Awards and nominations
Award	Won	Nominated
ALMA Awards	0	2
Artios Awards	1	1
ASCAP Film & TV Music Awards	1	1
American Comedy Awards	0	2
GLAAD Media Awards	1	3
Genesis Awards	0	1
Golden Globe Awards	4	10
NAACP Image Awards	0	4
International Monitor Awards	1	1
Primetime Emmy Awards	2	8
Blimp Awards	0	2
Satellite Awards	0	5
Screen Actors Guild Awards	2	2
TV Guide Awards	0	2
Totals	13	31
- Footnotes

The following is a list of awards and nominations received by Spin City, an American situation comedy which ran from September 17, 1996, until April 30, 2002, and was broadcast on ABC. During the show's six-year run, it received a number of various awards and nominations, including 3 Creative Arts Emmy awards nominations winning 1 in 2000 for Outstanding Cinematography for a Multi-Camera Series awarded to cinematographer Richard Quinlan, 10 Golden Globe award nominations winning 4 four Best Lead Actor in a Television Series - Comedy or Musical (awarded to 3 of 4 awarded to Michael J. Fox, 1 of 4 awarded to Charlie Sheen), 4 Primetime Emmy award nominations winning 1 in 2000 awarded to Fox for Outstanding Lead Actor in a Comedy Series, and 2 Screen Actors Guild awards for Outstanding Performance by a Male Actor in a Comedy Series awarded to Fox.

The show originally revolved around Deputy Mayor Michael Flaherty (Michael J. Fox), the deputy mayor of New York, who, together with his staff, tries to keep the town running. In 1998, Fox announced that he had Parkinson's disease, and Heather Locklear was cast to reduce Fox's workload. However, Fox announced that he was going to quit the show after the fourth season and was replaced by Charlie Sheen.

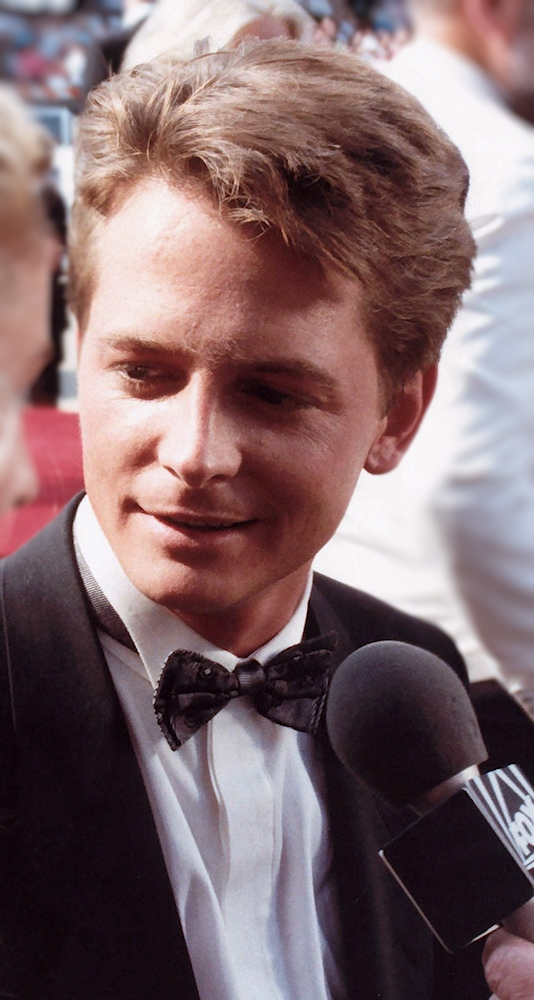
Michael J. Fox received four Golden Globe award nominations, winning three

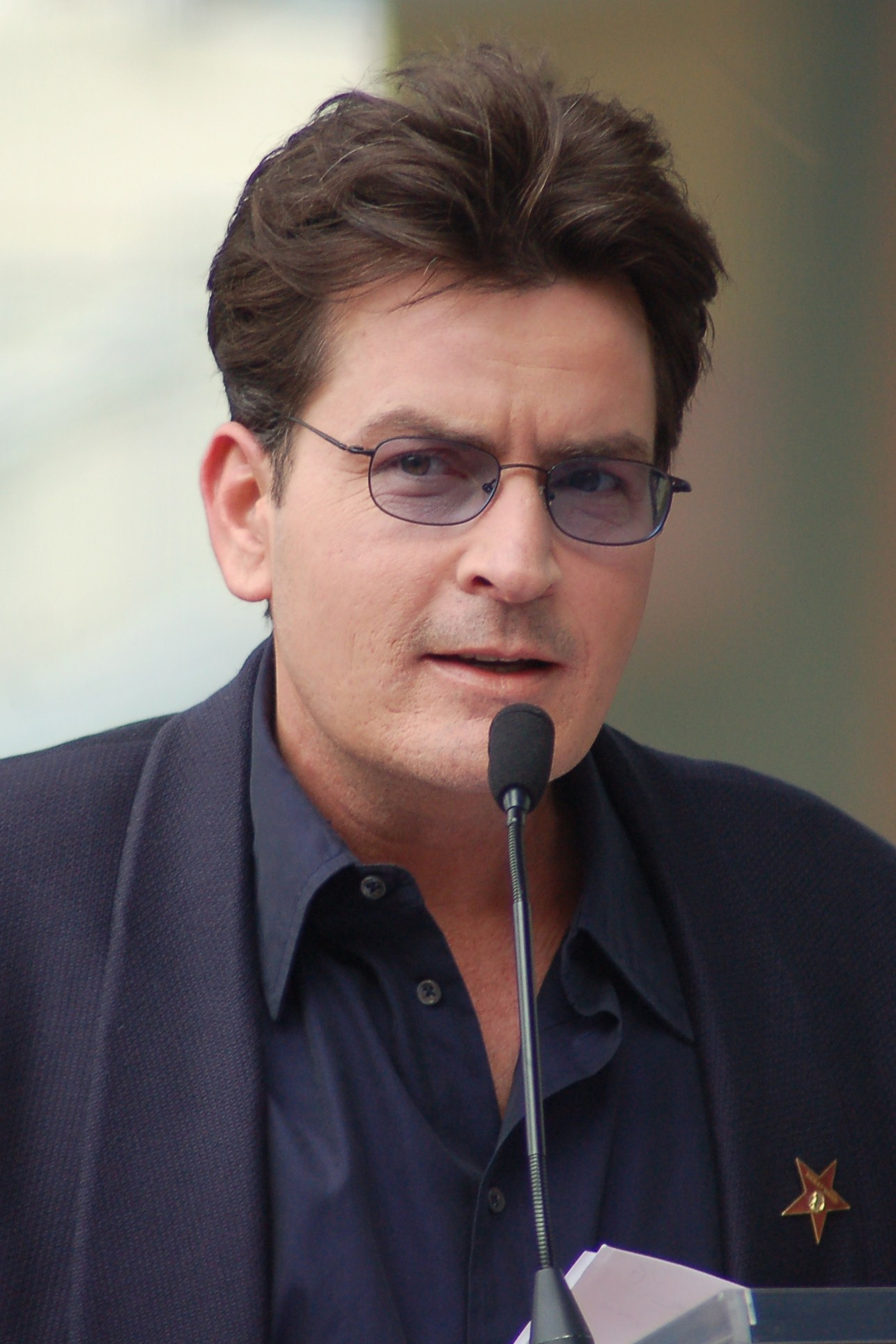
Charlie Sheen received one Golden Globe award nomination, and won the award

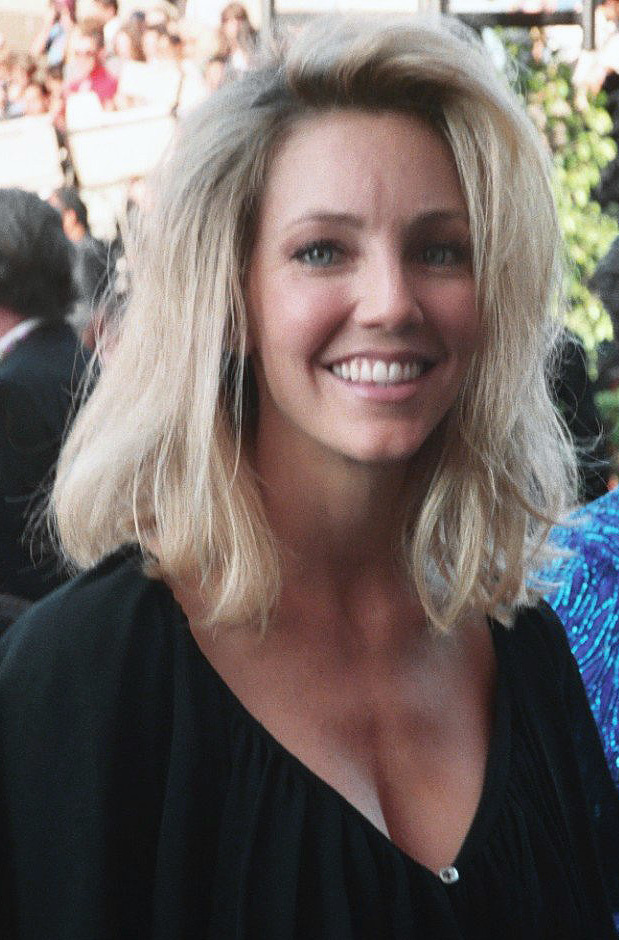
Heather Locklear received two Golden Globe award nominations, losing both to Sarah Jessica Parker

== ALMA awards ==
0 wins of 2 nominations

Year	Category	Nominee	Results	Lost to	Ref
2001	Outstanding Actor in a Television Series	Charlie Sheen	Nominated	Martin Sheen (The West Wing)	
2002	Outstanding Actor in a Television Series	Charlie Sheen	Nominated	Esai Morales (NYPD Blue)	

== American Comedy awards ==
0 wins of 2 nominations

Year	Category	Nominee	Results	Lost to	Ref
1999	Funniest Male Performer in a Television Series Network, Cable or Syndication	Michael J. Fox	Nominated	Garry Shandling (The Larry Sanders Show)	
2000	Funniest Male Performer in a Television Series Network, Cable or Syndication	Michael J. Fox	Nominated	Ray Romano (Everybody Loves Raymond)	

== ASCAP Film and Television Music awards ==
1 win of 1 nomination

Year	Category	Nominee	Results	Ref
1997	Top TV Series	Shelly Palmer	Won	

== Casting Society awards ==
1 win of 1 nomination

Year	Category	Nominee	Results	Ref
1997	Best Casting for Television, Comedy Pilot	Bonnie Finnegan	Won	

== Creative Arts Emmy awards ==
1 win of 4 nominations

Year	Category	Nominee	Results	Lost to	Ref
2000	Outstanding Cinematography for a Multi-Camera Series	Richard Quinlan	Won	tied with Peter Smokler (Sports Night)	
2000	Outstanding Sound Mixing for a Comedy Series or a Special	Richard Jacob	Nominated	Paul Lewis (Ally McBeal)	
2001	Outstanding Cinematography for a Multi-Camera Series	Mikel Neisers	Nominated	Tony Askins (Will & Grace)	
2001	Outstanding Multi-Camera Picture Editing for a Series	Noel Rogers	Nominated	Ron Volk (Frasier)	

== Genesis awards ==
1 win of 1 nomination

Year	Category	Nominee	Results	Ref
1999	Television - Comedy Series "The Deer Hunter"		Won	

== GLAAD Media awards ==
1 win of 3 nominations

Year	Category	Nominee	Results	Lost to	Ref
1997	Outstanding Television Comedy Series		Won		
1998	Outstanding Television Comedy Series		Nominated	Ellen	
1999	Outstanding Television Comedy Series		Nominated	Will & Grace	

== Golden Globe awards ==
4 wins of 10 nominations

Year	Category	Nominee	Results	Lost to	Ref
1997	Best Lead Actor in a Television Series - Comedy or Musical	Michael J. Fox	Nominated	John Lithgow (3rd Rock from the Sun)	
1998	Best Television Series - Comedy or Musical		Nominated	Ally McBeal	
1998	Best Lead Actor in a Television Series - Comedy or Musical	Michael J. Fox	Won		
1999	Best Television Series - Comedy or Musical		Nominated	Ally McBeal	
1999	Best Lead Actor in a Television Series - Comedy or Musical	Michael J. Fox	Won		
2000	Best Television Series - Comedy or Musical		Nominated	Sex and the City	
2000	Best Lead Actor in a Television Series - Comedy or Musical	Michael J. Fox	Won		
2000	Best Lead Actress in a Television Series - Comedy or Musical	Heather Locklear	Nominated	Sarah Jessica Parker (Sex and the City)	
2002	Best Lead Actor in a Television Series - Comedy or Musical	Charlie Sheen	Won		
2002	Best Lead Actress in a Television Series - Comedy or Musical	Heather Locklear	Nominated	Sarah Jessica Parker (Sex and the City)	

== Image awards ==
0 wins of 4 nominations

Year	Category	Nominee	Results	Lost to	Ref
1998	Outstanding Supporting Actor in a Comedy Series	Michael Boatman	Nominated	Alfonso Ribeiro (In the House)	
1999	Outstanding Supporting Actor in a Comedy Series	Michael Boatman	Nominated	Cedric the Entertainer (The Steve Harvey Show)	
2000	Outstanding Supporting Actor in a Comedy Series	Michael Boatman	Nominated	Cedric the Entertainer (The Steve Harvey Show)	
2001	Outstanding Supporting Actor in a Comedy Series	Michael Boatman	Nominated	Cedric the Entertainer (The Steve Harvey Show)	

== International Monitor awards ==
1 win of 1 nominations

Year	Category	Nominee	Results	Ref
1998	Film Originated Television Series - Director "In the Heat of the Day"	Andy Cadiff	Won	

== Nickelodeon Kid's Choice awards ==
0 wins of 2 nominations

Year	Category	Nominee	Results	Lost to	Ref
1997	Favorite Television Actor	Michael J. Fox	Nominated	Tim Allen (Home Improvement)	
2000	Favorite Television Actor	Michael J. Fox	Nominated	Kenan Thompson (All That)	

== Primetime Emmy awards ==
1 win of 4 nominations

Year	Category	Nominee	Results	Lost to	Ref
1997	Outstanding Lead Actor in a Comedy Series	Michael J. Fox	Nominated	John Lithgow (3rd Rock from the Sun)	
1998	Outstanding Lead Actor in a Comedy Series	Michael J. Fox	Nominated	Kelsey Grammer (Frasier)	
1999	Outstanding Lead Actor in a Comedy Series	Michael J. Fox	Nominated	John Lithgow (3rd Rock from the Sun)	
2000	Outstanding Lead Actor in a Comedy Series	Michael J. Fox	Won		

== Satellite awards ==
0 wins of 5 nominations

Year	Category	Nominee	Results	Lost to	Ref
1997	Best Television Series - Comedy or Musical		Nominated	The Larry Sanders Show	
1997	Best Lead Actor in a Series - Comedy or Musical	Michael J. Fox	Nominated	John Lithgow (3rd Rock from the Sun)	
1998	Best Television Series - Comedy or Musical		Nominated	Frasier	
1998	Best Lead Actor in a Series - Comedy or Musical	Michael J. Fox	Nominated	Kelsey Grammer (Frasier)	
1999	Best Lead Actor in a Series - Comedy or Musical	Michael J. Fox	Nominated	Drew Carey (The Drew Carey Show)	

== Screen Actors Guild awards ==
2 wins of 2 nominations

Year	Category	Nominee	Results	Ref
1999	Outstanding Performance by a Male Actor in a Comedy Series	Michael J. Fox	Won	
2000	Outstanding Performance by a Male Actor in a Comedy Series	Michael J. Fox	Won	

== TV Guide awards ==
0 wins of 2 nominations

Year	Category	Nominee	Results	Lost to	Ref
1999	Favorite Actor in a Comedy Series	Michael J. Fox	Nominated	Tim Allen (Home Improvement)	
2000	Favorite Actor in a Comedy Series	Michael J. Fox	Nominated	David Hyde Pierce (Frasier)	
