= Wackel-Elvis =

German-made Elvis dashboard figure that moves

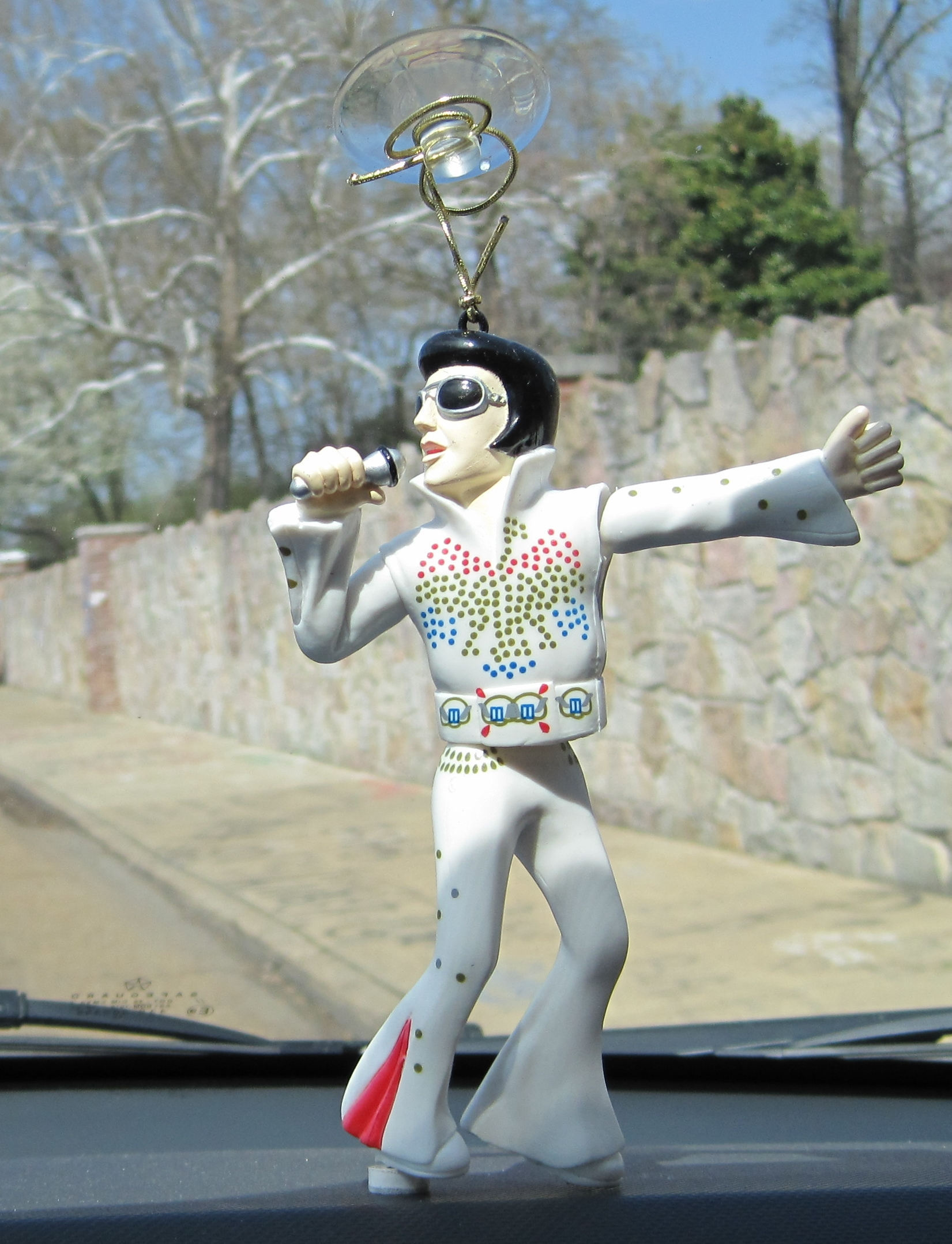
Wackel-Elvis dashboard figure at Graceland in Memphis, Tennessee

A Wackel-Elvis (German pronunciation: [ˈvakəlˈɛlvɪs], "Wobbly Elvis") is a small, hanging dashboard figure designed to resemble musician and actor Elvis Presley. A prototype of the figure was first introduced by the German automobile manufacturer Audi in a series of television commercials which were broadcast in several European countries. The commercials were produced by the advertising agency Saatchi & Saatchi in 2001 to promote Audi's new continuously variable "multitronic" transmission. Due to a high demand by Elvis fans after publication of the commercials, 15,000 Wackel-Elvis figures were produced and sold at the Audi factory outlet store.

Different from the design found in most conventional bobblehead dolls, not the head of the figure nods or wobbles on an otherwise static figure. Instead, the Wackel-Elvis figure is suspended from an elastic band connected to a suction cup attached to the windshield or rear window of a vehicle. The waist and left shoulder of the figure are equipped with flexible metal spring joints while its right foot stands on a pointed nail. This design prompts the figure to swing its hips, pivot around its vertical axis and shake its left arm up and down while the vehicle is in motion, creating an effect that resembles Elvis Presley performing on stage.

== Design ==
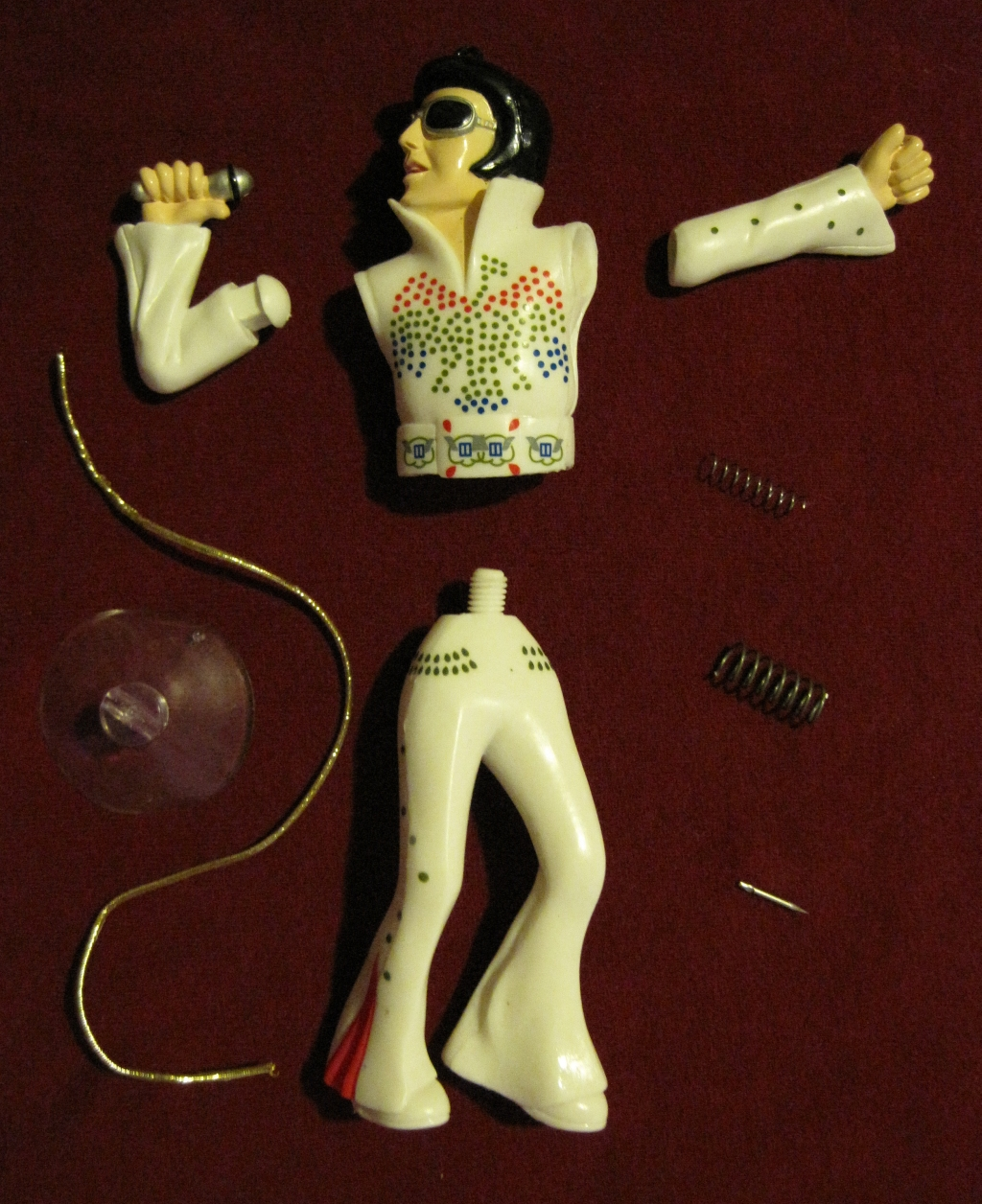
Parts of Wackel-Elvis

Wackel-Elvis was designed to portray musician and actor Elvis Presley around the time of the early 1970s. The dress of Wackel-Elvis resembles the white jumpsuit Elvis Presley wore in the 1973 Aloha from Hawaii television satellite broadcast. Other than most conventional bobblehead dolls, in which a flexible neck joint connects a wobbling head to a static figure that rests on a surface, Wackel-Elvis is attached to the inside of the windshield or rear window of a vehicle. The figure is suspended from a suction cup connecting to an adjustable elastic string which, at its other end, is attached to a loop on top of the head of the figure. On a sharply pointed nail, protruding approximately .2 inches (5 mm) from the sole of the right foot of the figure, Wackel-Elvis stands on top of the dashboard or rear cargo cover. With the vehicle in motion, the left arm stretched away from the body of the figure produces centrifugal force, causing the figure to spin back and forth around its vertical axis. While spinning, the foot of the figure is held in place by the nail and its head held in place being suspended from the string. The left arm and hip of Wackel-Elvis wobble consistent with the vehicle motion, creating the illusion of Elvis Presley performing or dancing on stage.

Four injection molded semi-rigid plastic pieces constitute the circa 6 inches (15 cm) tall figure which features printed accents on the dress and hand-painted details on hands, face and neck, hair, sunglasses, microphone and inserts in the trouser legs. Molded as one piece, the upper body of the figure including a static head is the most prominent part. The right arm with hand and microphone is also molded as one piece and attached to the upper body piece at the right shoulder by a snap-in joint with a square connector which keeps the right arm of the figure in a static position relative to the upper body piece. The lower body piece consists of the pelvic area and both legs molded as one piece. At the waist of the figure, the upper and lower body pieces are connected to each other by a flexible metal spring joint, as are the left arm piece and the upper body piece at the left shoulder. Both threaded connectors of the spring joint at the left shoulder of the figure are recessed, hiding the spring mechanism of the joint. The threaded connector of the lower body piece protrudes upward but the spring joint mechanism at the waist of the figure is concealed by a connector deeply recessed under the waist and belt portion of the jumpsuit which constitutes the bottom portion of the upper body piece.

Due to safety concerns, the pointed nail in the right foot of the figure was removed from some exported versions of Wackel-Elvis. However, the missing nail can be replaced by nails found in common plastic pushpins after the plastic surrounding the nail has been removed.

== Television commercials ==
Wackel-Elvis in the Audi television commercial by Saatchi & Saatchi (2001)

In 2001, German automobile manufacturer Audi aired television commercials in Europe to promote their new electronically controlled continuously variable (or stepless) "multitronic" transmission. The Frankfurt, Germany branch of advertising agency Saatchi & Saatchi, headquartered in New York City, produced the Audi commercials featuring an Elvis impersonator whose car had broken down. The Elvis impersonator and his Wackel-Elvis were picked up by a friendly fellow driver - played by German actress Karina Krawczyk - in an Audi equipped with the new transmission. The punch line of the commercials was that due to the lack of shifting motion while accelerating with the continuously variable transmission the Audi was equipped with, the Wackel-Elvis dashboard figure did not wobble as it had done in the Elvis impersonator's car before it broke down, causing disappointment for the impersonator.

In some of the commercials an Elvis Presley sound-alike version of the 1965 Roger Miller song King of the Road was used as background music. Another set of the series of commercials featured a generic Elvis Presley sound alike title as background song. In some of the spots the Elvis impersonator was offered a ride in a silver colored Audi sedan. In other versions he was picked up by the same fellow driver in a silver colored Audi wagon. Close to the end of the commercials Wackel-Elvis, immobilized by the stepless transmission, was prodded in the belly to initiate the wobbling motion in the Audi automobile. In some of the commercials in the series, the stub was executed by the female driver, in others by the Elvis impersonator. While flagging down the fellow driver after the breakdown of his car, in some versions of the commercials the Elvis impersonator supported his gesture with a sharp and short whistle. In other versions of the spot he remained quiet when gesturing the driver of the car to stop.

== Commercial product ==
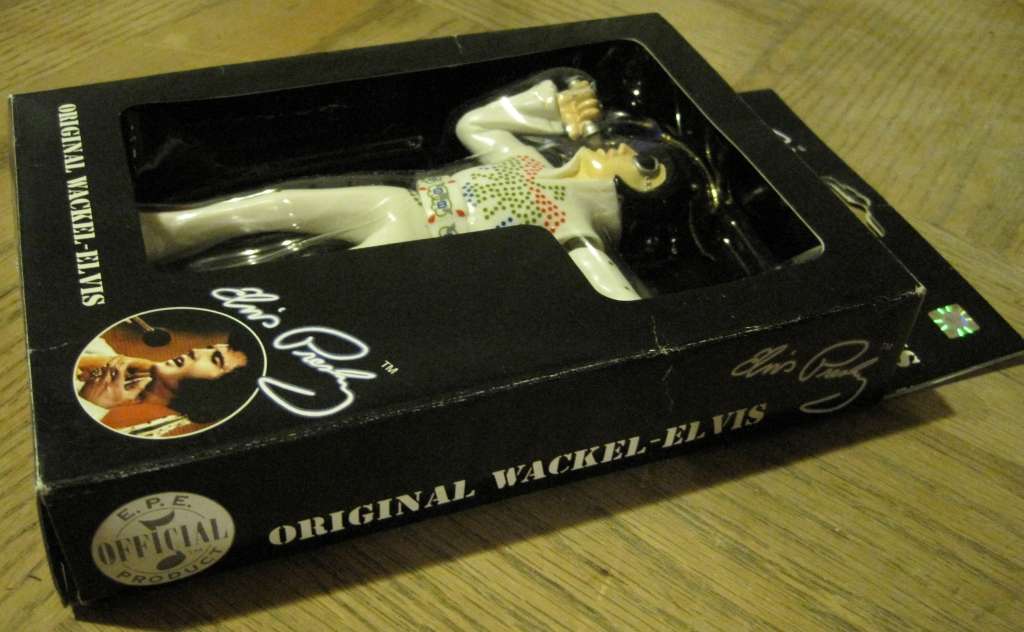
Wackel-Elvis retail box

The Audi commercials featured a prototypical Wackel-Elvis, initially intended for use in the television commercials only. Unlike the eventual commercial dashboard figure, the Wackel-Elvis featured in the Audi commercials was presented with blonde hair and wearing a golden jumpsuit; the prototype was designed with more pronounced bow legs than the commercial product. Due to high demand of viewers after the spots aired in several European countries, an initial production run of 15,000 figures was sold out quickly. Another 150,000 Wackel-Elvis dashboard figures were mass-produced in China to satisfy the high demand for the product. In 2001, Wackel-Elvis was sold for DEM 15.60 (EUR 7.98 or ca. USD 11.00) in the Audi factory outlet store in Ingolstadt, Germany.

Wackel-Elvis is a product officially licensed by Elvis Presley Enterprises (E. P. E.). The license is documented by the "E. P. E. Official Product" logo on the side and a hologram on the front of the retail box. A portrait of Elvis Presley and an image of his signature are reproduced on the front of the retail box. Counterfeit versions of Wackel-Elvis in a golden dress, not licensed by E. P. E., were available on the market shortly after the release of the official product to participate in its commercial popularity. The retail box of the counterfeit figure did not bear the "E. P. E. Official Product" logo nor the hologram.

== Cultural impact ==
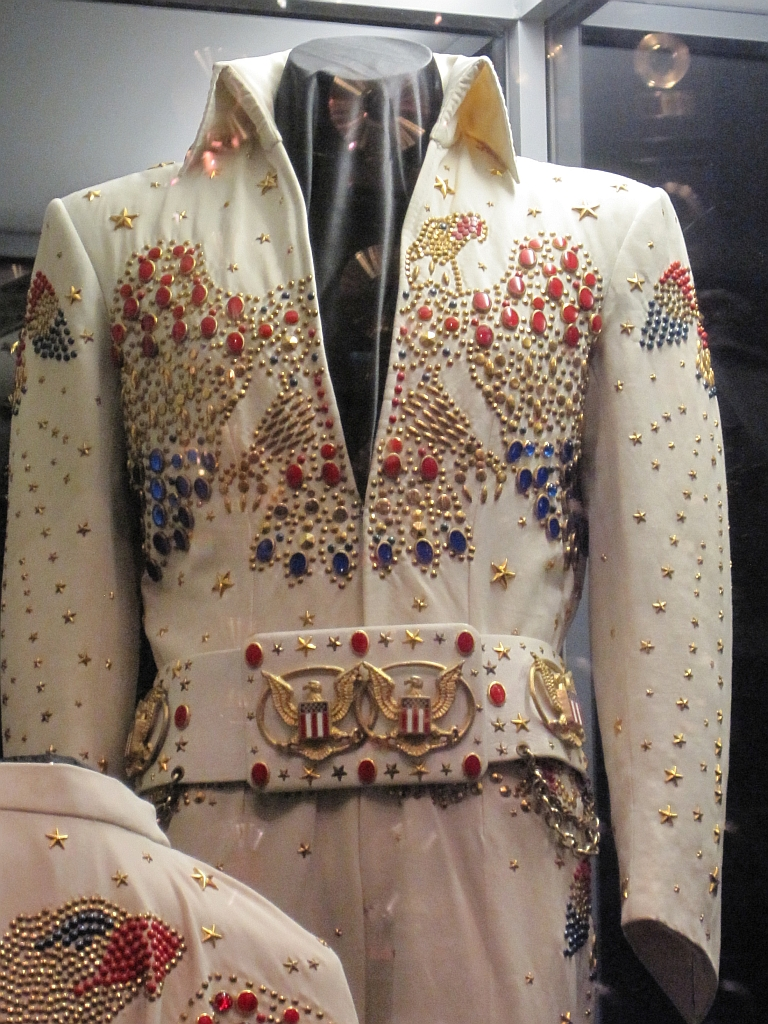
Aloha from Hawaii jumpsuit

Videos have been produced by fans of Wackel-Elvis which closely relate to the product. One video features an animated digitalization of Wackel-Elvis. In the animation, the digitalized figure creates the impression of Wackel-Elvis dancing to the 1956 recording of the Elvis Presley song Too Much. Another video shows a car ride through the Elbe Tunnel beneath the River Elbe in Hamburg, Germany from the dashboard perspective of Wackel-Elvis. A recent performance shows Wackel Elvis doing an off hand rendition of "Blue Suede Shoes".

== See also ==
- Bobblehead
- Elvis Presley
- Cultural depictions of Elvis Presley
- Saatchi & Saatchi
- Flip Flap
