= Let's Go Mets Go =

Shelly Palmer song

"Let's Go Mets"

Single
- A-side: "Let's Go Mets"
- Released: 1986
- Genre: Rock music
- Length: 3:22
- Label: Vestron Records
- Songwriters: Shelly Palmer, Gregory Smith & Hal Hackady
- Producer: Shelly Palmer

"Let's Go Mets Go!" (also entitled "Let's Go Mets!") was the rally song of the 1986 World Series champion New York Mets baseball team. The song was the creation of famed advertiser Jerry Della Femina and two of his executives, Bob Sherman and Jon Olken. The idea for the song was conceived in July 1986, when the Mets had a powerful lead in the National League East, and the pennant seemed predictable. "Let's Go Mets Go" was composed and produced by Shelly Palmer, and lead vocals were performed by Tom Bernfeld, and was released by Vestron Records.

A video was also produced, featuring Mets players, coaches and fans, along with a cameo appearance by Joe Piscopo. The video and song was debuted on August 27, 1986, at a game against the San Diego Padres. The video was produced by Vestron Video, who released it on VHS with a "making of" of the music video included.
