= Multitronic =

Continuously variable transmission made by Audi

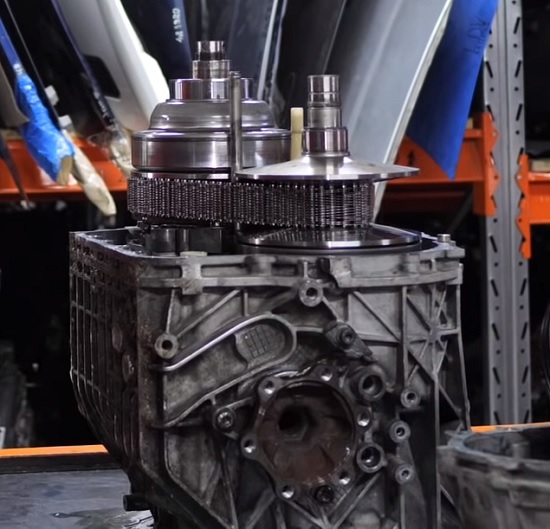
Audi Multitronic partially disassembled

Multitronic is a stepless transmission launched by AUDI AG in late 1999, jointly developed and manufactured by LuK. The capitalization used is multitronic (spelled by Audi with a lower-case leading 'm') and is a registered trademark of AUDI AG.

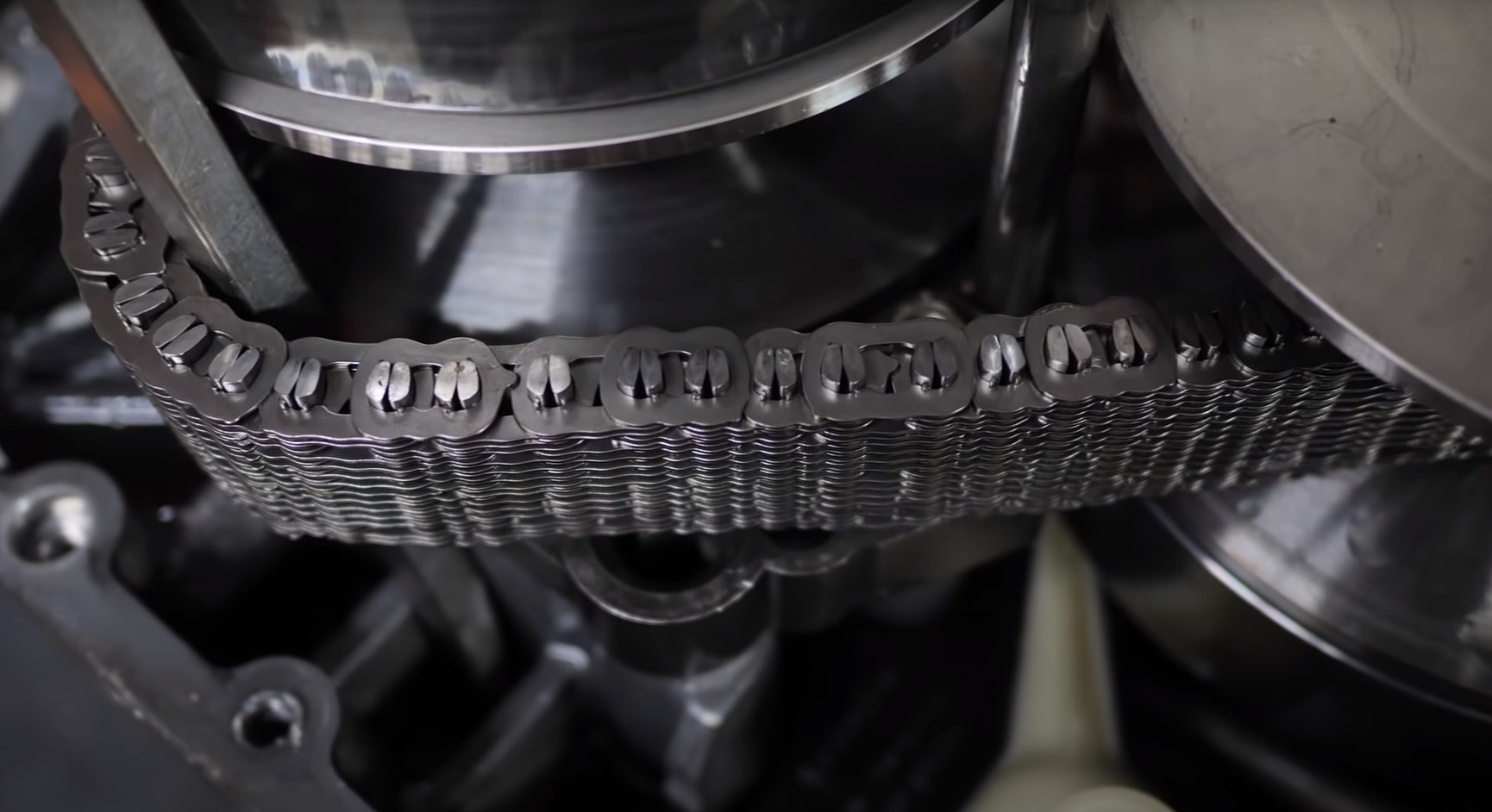
Close-up of the multitronic transmission's chain

It is based on the principles of a continuously variable transmission (CVT) popularised by DAF, but differs from other CVTs by using an unconventional type of steel chain consisting of parallel flat chain segments. Unlike the conventional CVT push belt, the Multitronic chain uses tension to transfer forces.

Multitronic is a term originally coined in the original series of Star Trek (see season two, episode 24: The Ultimate Computer).

It offers a stepless automatic transmission in which the ratio between the input shaft and output shaft can be varied continuously within a given range, providing virtually an infinite number of possible ratios. The Multitronic system uses a link-plate chain drive, an oil-cooled multi-plate clutch (initially of six parts, later of seven to enable it to cope better with the high torque outputs of larger turbodiesel engines), and complex electronics, to overcome the traditional shortcomings of CVTs, and allow a CVT transmission to be paired with a more powerful engine.

== History ==
The transmission was introduced in 1999 with the European market Audi A6, and brought to US market models in 2002.

In 2013, Audi owners in the USA won a class action lawsuit against Audi, which alleged that the Multitronic transmission had "manufacturing and design flaws that caused them to fail."

Audi discontinued the Multitronic transmission since then in favour of dual clutch stepped transmissions.

== Function ==
The transmission is monitored and regulated by Audi's "Dynamic Regulating Programme" (DRP), which tracks the driver's inputs (from how the driver applies the throttle pedal), driving conditions, and engine load - to compute the optimal gear ratio for fuel efficiency or maximum performance, as mandated by the user. The transmission can select pre-programmed underdrive to increase performance, or overdrive to improve economy. From 2004, Multitronic transmissions offered manual selection of a 'sport mode' to pre-select the performance mapping. The electronic system also includes sensors to detect whether the vehicle is traveling downhill, and provides additional engine braking in such circumstances. Multitronic also offers a number of driver-selectable fixed ratios, selectable from either the gear-lever in a sequential style, or via (optional) steering wheel-mounted fingertip paddle-shift controls.

Early versions offered six ratios; in 2004, this was increased to seven, while new Audi models now have Multitronic transmission with eight ratios. Some Audi A6 variants that feature the Multitronic transmission are now equipped with the fingertip controls on steering wheel as standard. These controls can also switch to semi-automatic mode when one of the paddles is activated; however, they revert to fully automatic after a predetermined period of time of inactivity.

== Real world performance ==
Multitronic offers performance and economy similar to, and in some cases better than, the equivalent five-speed manual gearboxes, and superior to the traditional automatic transmission. Particular performance advantages are noticed with 'in-gear' seamless acceleration times over equivalent manual transmission cars.

Multitronic was offered on front wheel drive-only versions of the Audi A4, Audi A5, Audi A6, and the SEAT Exeo with the 2.0 TSI gasoline engine. It is not compatible with the quattro four-wheel drive system, nor transverse engine installations such as in the Audi A3. At first, the (model 01J) torque limit was 310 newton-metres (229 lbf⋅ft), but the later model 0AW transmission is now modified to withstand 400 newton-metres (295 lbf⋅ft) torque. In 2014 Audi announced to discontinue Multitronic and replace it with S tronic, effectively making the Audi A5 8T the last model it was sold with.

== Key data ==
Gear ratios (Note: Differences in gear ratios have a measurable, direct impact on vehicle dynamics, performance, waste emissions as well as fuel mileage)
Model 0AW	Gear								
Model 0AW	R	1	2	3	4	5	6	7	8
2007 – 2011
A4-A5 FSI	−2.919	2.404	1.546	1.177	0.928	0.740	0.593	0.479	0.382
2007 – 2011
A4-A5 TDI A5 2.7 09-11	−2.998	2.478	1.351	0.996	0.782	0.635	0.528	0.443	0.369 0.382
A4-A5 TFSI	−2.958	2.436	1.604	1.181	0.910	0.723	0.576	0.458	0.381
A4L 09-11	-3.015	2.492	1.574	1.147	0.894	0.715	0.579	0.465	0.370
2012 – 2016
A4-A5 TDI	−2.919	2.404	1.469	1.071	0.825	0.657	0.533	0.441	0.382
A6-A7 TDI	−2.908	2.404	1.441	1.031	0.797	0.637	0.523	0.437	0.382
A4 2.0 (190)	−2.908	2.542	1.469	1.071	0.825	0.657	0.545	0.462	0.397
2012 – 2016
A4-A5 TFSI	−2.958	2.436	1.626	1.232	0.976	0.783	0.629	0.499	0.381
A4 1.8 (120)	−2.958	2.436	1.616	1.152	0.891	0.705	0.566	0.459	0.381
A6 TFSI	−2.947	2.436	1.686	1.241	0.960	0.760	0.609	0.481	0.381
2011 – 2014
A6-A7 FSI	-2.947	2.436	1.571	1.173	0.922	0.740	0.597	0.482	0.381
2012 – 2015
A4 2.0T 12-13	−2.919	2.404	1.556	1.140	0.885	0.701	0.566	0.458	0.382
A6 2.0T Fronttrack	-4.633	3.829	1.686	1.241	0.960	0.760	0.609	0.481	0.408

== Promotional campaign ==
In 2001, Audi promoted the Multitronic transmission with television commercials throughout Europe, featuring an impersonator of musician and actor Elvis Presley. A prototypical dashboard figure - later named "Wackel-Elvis" ("Wobble Elvis" or "Wobbly Elvis") - appeared in the commercials to demonstrate the smooth ride in an Audi equipped with the Multitronic transmission. The dashboard figure was originally intended for use in the commercials only, but after they aired the demand for Wackel-Elvis grew among fans and the figure was mass-produced in China and marketed by Audi in their factory outlet store.
