= Nohohon Zoku =

Bobble head figurines made by Tomy

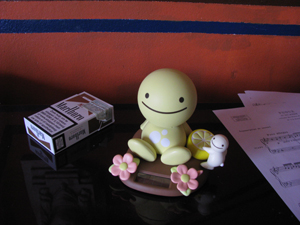
- Type: bobble head
- Company: Tomy
- Country: Japan
- Availability: 2002–present
- Materials: Plastic

Nohohon Zoku (のほほん族) are a range of fist-sized bobble head figurines made by the Japanese toy company Tomy. They first went on sale in Japan on July 18, 2002. They are distinguished by a large spherical head with a wide smile and dots for eyes. The purpose of the dolls is stress relief. This has made them popular as novelty items in offices. Nohohon are marketed as Sunshine Buddies in English speaking countries.

== Environmental focus ==
The figurines are intended to be eco-friendly. The Nohohon Cycle rotates from the Earth, to food, people and the environment.

Most Nohohon Zoku are powered by small solar panels, they gently sway their heads until the light source is removed. This is unlike traditional bobble head doll, whose heads wobble when poked or moved. Hanauta no Tami are powered by three triple-A batteries.).

== Figurines ==
The name Nohohon Zoku means "carefree family." The original two lines were the Hidamari no Tami (ひだまりの民 Sunny People) and the Hanauta no Tami (はなうたの民 Humming People). The Hidamari no Tami can hold a business card sized piece of paper, whereas the Hanauta no Tami can sing and dance. Since the original introduction, other lines have been introduced, including a range from Disney and Pingu characters.

The size of the figurines varies with the model, with the Hidamari no Tami measuring about 100 mm (3.9 in) in width, depth and height. The Hanauta no Tami are slightly taller, at 145 mm (5.7 in).

== Sales ==
Basic Hidamari no Tami figurines cost about 1000 yen, though the price of Hanauta no Tami is approximately double.

In the United Kingdom, the toys, known as Sunshine Buddies, are sold for about £8 each and are marketed toward women ages 20 to 45 as friendship gifts.

In the U.S. they are usually marketed at 13.99 U.S. dollars.

== See also ==
- Flip Flap
