= Thanjavur doll =

Traditional South Indian terracotta bobblehead from Thanjavur

- Geographical indication
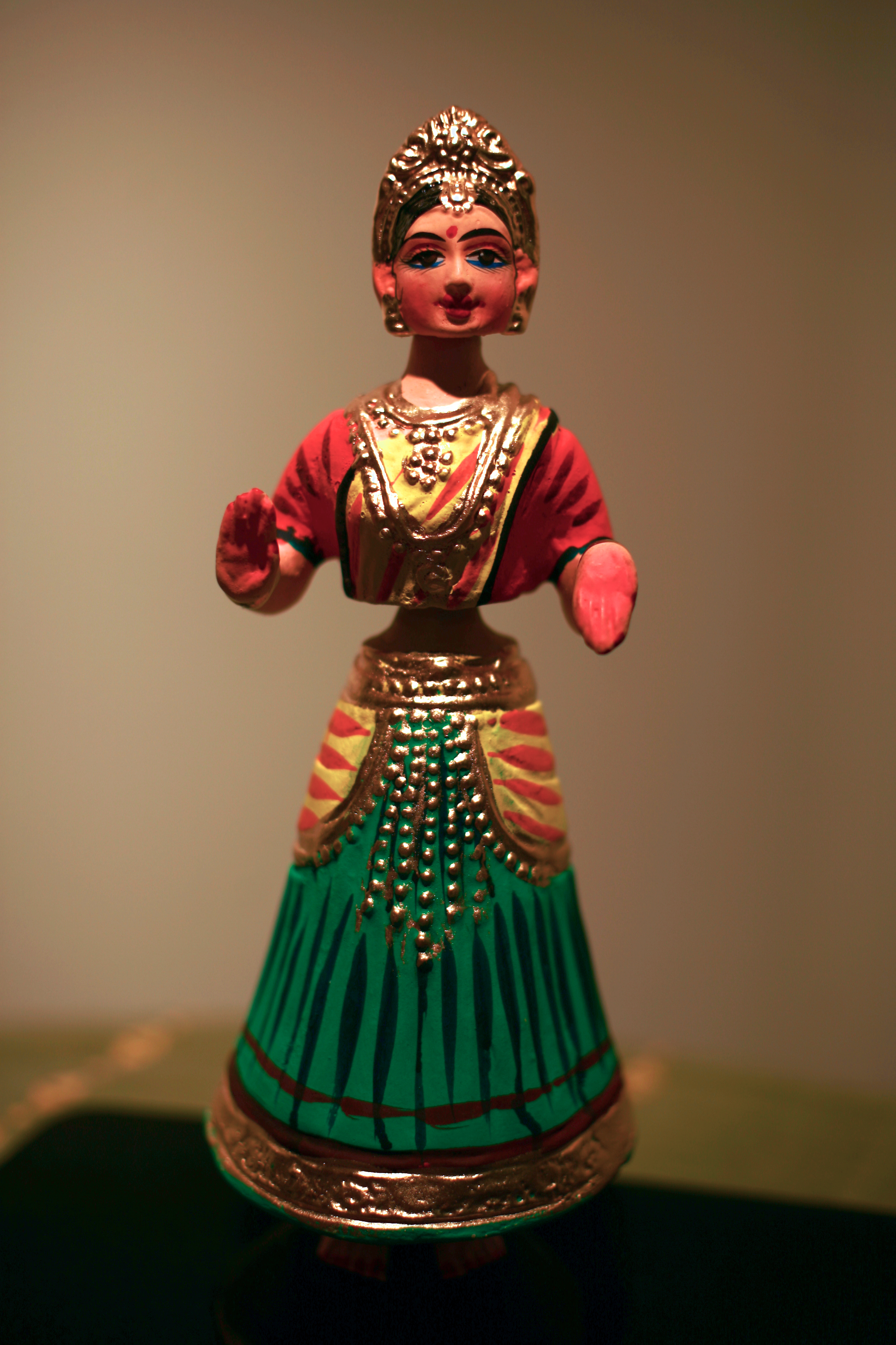
- A typical Thanjavur Bommai (doll) made of terracotta
- Description: terracotta dolls manufactured in Thanjavur
- Type: handicraft
- Area: Thanjavur, Tamil Nadu
- Country: India
- Registered: 2008-09
- Material: terracotta

The Thanjavur doll is a type of traditional Indian bobblehead or roly-poly toy made of terracotta material. The centre of gravity and total weight of the doll is concentrated at its bottom-most point, generating a dance-like continuous movement with slow oscillations. These toys are traditionally handmade, finished with detailed, painted exteriors. They have been recognized as a Geographical Indication by the Government of India as of 2008-09.

== See also ==
- Thanjavur painting
