= Bobble-head doll syndrome =

- Specialty: Neurology

Bobble-head doll syndrome is a rare neurological movement disorder in which patients, usually children around age 3, begin to bob their head and shoulders forward and back, or sometimes side-to-side, involuntarily, in a manner reminiscent of a bobblehead doll. The syndrome is related to cystic lesions and swelling of the third ventricle in the brain.

Symptoms of bobble-head doll syndrome are diverse, including both physical and neurological symptoms. The most common form of treatment is surgical implanting of a shunt to relieve the swelling of the brain.

== Signs and symptoms ==
Bobble-head doll syndrome is first reported as a movement disorder in patients. Patients often undergo imaging to investigate potential neurological causes.

=== Physical ===
The main physical symptom of bobble-head doll syndrome is the most obvious to diagnose and involves two to three bobs per second of the head, which can sometimes also include the shoulders and upper torso. The patient is unaware of the movements and unable to control them unless directed to stop or given simple mental tasks such as basic arithmetic or spelling words. However, once the task is completed by the patient, the bobbing tends to resume after about a minute. Thus, the bobbing is described by doctors as volitional, or able to be stopped by making a conscious decision.

=== Neurological ===
A typical symptom in patients diagnosed with bobble-head doll syndrome is an enlargement of the head due to accumulation of cerebrospinal fluid in the third ventricle. This dilatation impairs communication between ventricles as well as the function of other surrounding structures.

Quite often, the swelling is present along with cystic lesions in the third ventricle or surrounding periventricular structures. In reference to bobble-head doll syndrome, a third ventricular cystic lesion causes an obstruction in the foramina of Monro, which communicates with the lateral ventricles, and the proximal, cerebral aqueduct of Sylvius, which communicates with the fourth ventricle. It has also been reported to be caused by a cystic choroid plexus papilloma of the third ventricle and obstructive hydrocephalus. It is this blockage that is thought to produce the characteristic bobble-head movements. Other patients have seen the onset of bobble-head doll syndrome from the presence of a suprasellar cyst in the arachnoid mater of the meninges. It, too, obstructs the foramen of Monro.

== Pathophysiology ==
The presence of cystic lesions, causing swelling in the third ventricle, is a common feature in all patients. It is this dilatation that causes pressure to be applied to the surrounding structures of the third ventricle, such as the diencephalon. It is possible that the back and forth movement of fluid within the cyst causes rhythmic pressure on the diencephalic motor pathways. One of the key periventricular structures in that pathway is the thalamus which is responsible for relaying motor signals to the cerebral cortex as well as regulating consciousness, sleep, and alertness. The disappearance of the head movements while asleep implies that their origin may lie within the extrapyramidal system which is a part of the motor system that controls coordination of movement. The tracts associated with the extrapyramidal system are controlled by various structures of the central nervous system, such as the cerebellum and basal ganglia. The basal ganglia plays a large part in controlling motor function and thus, abnormalities to this system can result in movement disorders such as Parkinson's disease and dyskinesia, both of which share commonalities with bobble-head doll syndrome.

The tic-like movements and swelling of the third ventricle associated with bobble-head doll syndrome are similar to that of other movement disorders caused by diseases of the corpus callosum and aforementioned basal ganglia. Because of the swelling, added pressure is applied to these formations causing their basic functions to be disturbed. Through pneumoencephalographic studies of patients with Parkinson's, Huntington's, and dystonia musculorum deformans, it was discovered that, along with patients with bobble-head doll syndrome, a statistically significant swelling of the third ventricle existed. Thus, researchers believe that the connection between bobble-head doll syndrome and other movement disorders is that, in both, the movements are not caused by a particular lesion, but rather a hindrance of multiple neuronal structures or pathways. In the case of bobble-head doll syndrome, the disturbance is related to those structures proximal to the third ventricle. More research is being conducted in order to find the neurophysiologic basis for bobble-head doll syndrome and its connection with other movement disorders, but with the rare occurrence of the disorder, progress is slow.

Another theory exists behind the cause of bobble-head doll syndrome. It states that the constant head movements create a temporary relief in intraventricular obstruction by both shifting the cyst to the posterior—away from the foramina of Monro—and a reduction in cyst size. This points to the fact that the bobbing may be a "learned behavior" and a way to relieve the symptoms of hydrocephalus.

== Diagnosis ==
In order to try to investigate the flow dynamics of the cerebrospinal fluid, doctors utilize cisternography, which injects a radiolabeled substance into the CSF via lumbar puncture. The CSF flow is then tracked by taking pictures at incremental times. However, cisternography is declining in use with physicians who are opting to use MRI instead, to assess CSF flow.

Cerebrospinal fluid flow is important in diagnosing bobble-head doll syndrome because disturbances in CSF dynamics can be contributed to blockages in the connections between ventricles such as foramen and aqueducts. Such blockages are tell-tale signs that a cyst is present. Also, if CSF cannot flow freely, it will begin to accumulate leading to hydrocephalus. CSF is secreted by choroid plexuses located on the roofs of the ventricles. After travelling through each ventricle, the CSF leaves the fourth ventricle and flows around the brain stem, cerebellum, hemispheres, and finally, down into the subarachnoid space. To complete the cycle, the CSF then moves back up to the basal cisternae to start over. In patients with bobble-head doll syndrome, an impairment exists in the ability to reabsorb CSF by the arachnoid granulations leading to an accumulation. Presently, doctors will utilize magnetic resonance imaging to get an image of the affected area. If swelling exists in the third ventricle along with cystic lesions, both of which are accompanied by the characteristic head bobbing, a diagnosis of bobble-head doll syndrome is likely. From here, the doctor will propose the available treatment options listed below.

== Treatment ==
=== Removal of lesion ===
In the case of choroid plexus papilloma, surgical removal of the cyst-containing lesion from within the third ventricle caused a full recovery. The mobile nature of the cystic lesion led to its intermittent obstruction of the foramen of Monro and proximal aqueduct, producing the bobble-head symptoms. Once removed, all symptoms disappeared.

=== Ventriculoperitoneal shunt ===
Often, doctors will implant a shunt to reduce the intracranial pressure caused by the accumulation of CSF in the third ventricle. Typically, this will succeed in restricting the swelling and allowing proper flow of CSF. With this relief, the head bobbing will disappear and bobble-head doll syndrome will no longer be present. However, in one case, after a year of shunt placement, the patient switched from forward-back bobbing to side-to-side swaying. There was no discernible reasoning for the switch found. A hypothesis emerged from this case that cerebellar malformations themselves can cause bobble-head doll syndrome.

=== Endoscopic ventriculocystocisternostomy ===
For those with suprasellar arachnoid cysts, it has been discovered that endoscopic ventriculocystocisternostomy is the optimal treatment option. By fenestrating, or opening, the cystic membrane and removing the fluid, all obstructions of the aqueduct were resolved. In patients receiving this treatment, a full recovery is the most common result.

== Prognosis ==
Although surgery is agreed upon as the primary treatment option for patients with bobble-head doll syndrome, surgical treatment has been reported to completely remove all symptoms in only half of the cases. Reason for this stems from late diagnoses which can significantly decrease the hope for a full recovery and lead to permanent profound obstructive hydrocephalus. Thus, prognosis depends upon the time elapsed between the first signs of the disorder and the time of surgical treatment. Early diagnosis and treatment is highly important in successful treatment of bobble-head doll syndrome.

== Epidemiology ==
The rarity of the syndrome is such that, since 1966, only 34 cases have been reported. Of those cases, the average onset of head bobbing is 3 years and 3 months old while surgical intervention occurred on average, at age 6 years and 11 months.

== See also ==
- Hydrocephalus
- Movement disorder
- Dandy–Walker syndrome
