= Flip Flap =

Solar powered toy

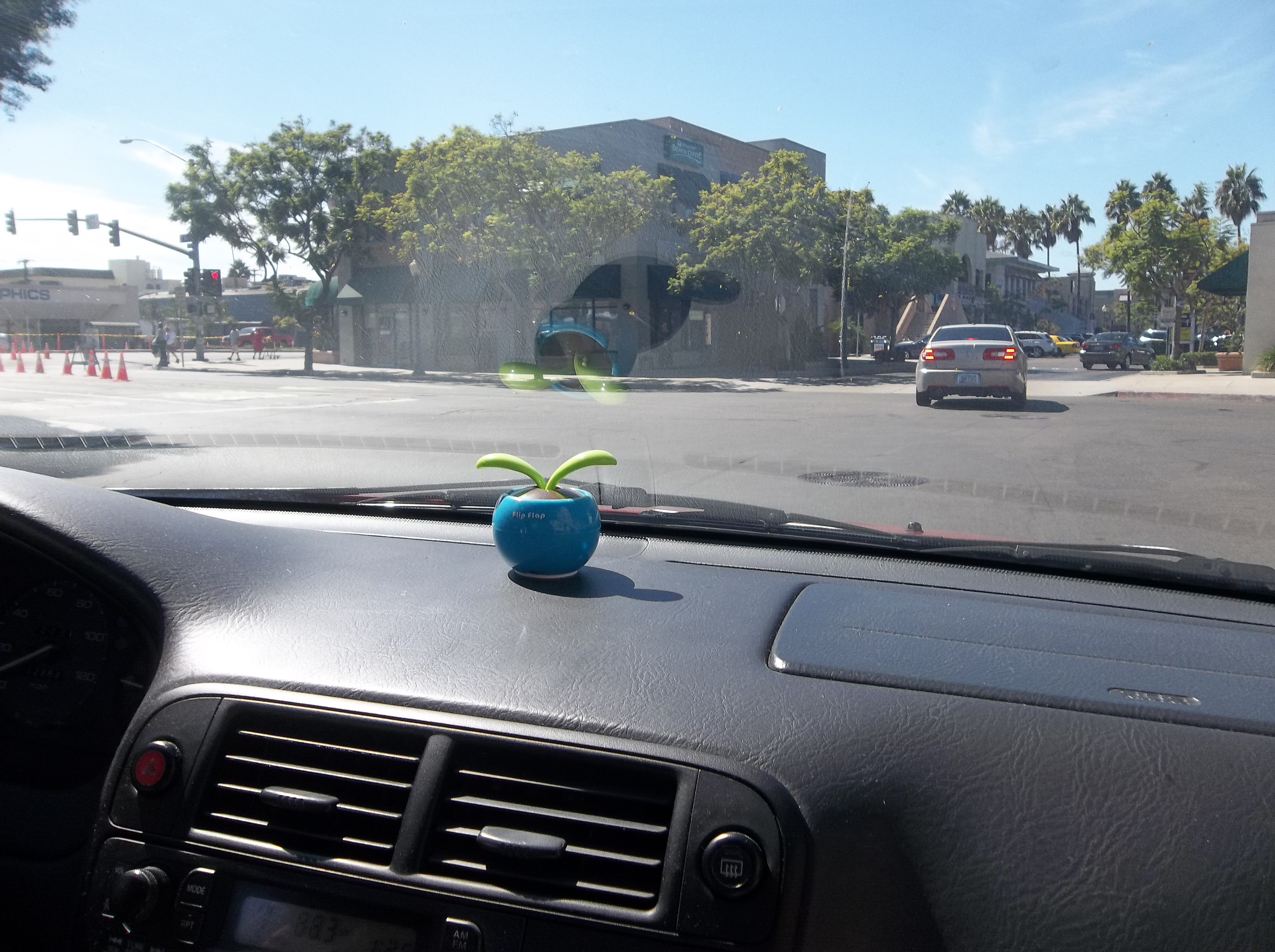
- Type: Solar powered toy
- Country: Japan
- Materials: Plastic

Flip Flap is a solar powered toy that resembles a plant.

The small solar panel powers two leaves that bounce up and down continuously until the light source to the solar panel is stopped. The leaves can be stopped from bouncing by a switch on the underside of the device.

The Flip Flap has a large cult following in Japan, but the popularity of the ornamental gadget grew in the UK being marketed under the Tomy brand. Flip Flaps come in different models like the "Q" (which is round) and "F" (which has the shape of a flower pot). The big Flip Flaps (depends on the number) usually have three movements. Once you turn it on, the leaves begin to move up and down. If you tap one of the leaves, it shall begin to move seesaw to the direction in which the leaf was tapped. The electronics used in these toys are well known and were originally used for electronic clocks.

== Counterfeits ==
As with other Tomy manufactured solar powered toys, there are fake Flip Flaps being sold in stores. These are often cheaply made in China and are limited to only an up-and-down motion, and are incapable of the 3 different movements characteristic of authentic Flip Flaps. The fake and real versions look extremely similar, but consumers can differentiate between the two by looking for the Tomy logo, almost entirely Japanese characters on the box (limited English), and dark green leaves (fake Flip Flaps have light green leaves, as opposed to the darker, real ones of slightly better quality). Other Flip Flap knockoffs are sold that are solely inspired by Flip Flaps, but not directly based on Flip Flaps, as they are sold in very different packaging than the authentic ones and have flowers that look different.

According to the European Union patent database, the patent was copied by a small Chinese company called "Shenzhen Longgang Pinghu Tengy". It seems that Tomy has sold the licence to market this product as "Flip Flap" in the European Union and the Chinese company infringed the copyright.

== See also ==
- Nohohon Zoku
