= Shelly Palmer =

American television advertising and technology consultant

- Born: Shelton Leigh Palmer
- Education: B.A. (direction and production of film and television)
- Alma mater: New York University
- Occupations: Business advisor and consultant
- Website: Official website

Shelton Leigh "Shelly" Palmer is an advertising, marketing and technology consultant, and business adviser. He is the Professor of Advanced Media in Residence at the S. I. Newhouse School of Public Communications at Syracuse University and CEO of The Palmer Group, a tech strategy and solutions consulting practice. He is the former president of the National Academy of Television Arts & Sciences (NATAS), New York chapter (NATAS/NY), and he served as the chairman of both the Advanced Media Committee and the Technology Committee for the organization. He is also known for his work as a composer and producer.

== Education and career ==
Palmer completed his graduation from the New York University's Tisch School of the Arts with a B.A. in direction and production of film and television in 1979. He started his career at age 12 as a musician. He wrote Meow Mix jingles and composed music for Live with Regis and Kelly, Spin City and MSNBC. The "Palmer News Package" is Palmer's arrangement of the Channel 2 News theme originating from WBBM-TV in Chicago and has been used by stations across the country including WBBM's sister station WCBS-TV in New York City, who commissioned the arrangement.

Palmer produced HotPop, which aired on Starz/Encore's Wam! Network. He also produced NBC Universal's Digital Life with Shelly Palmer, and Live Digital with Shelly Palmer.

== Radio work ==
Palmer's first "full service" radio production client was The ABC Television Network. SLP&Co. scripted, cast, produced, composed and trafficked over 150 radio spots per year to ABC's 213 affiliated television stations. During the early 1990s, SLP&Co. expanded its staff and production facilities to include more work with music as well as programming and production for CD-ROM, the World Wide Web, Interactive Television and other digital media.

== Interactive television ==
Palmer's first solo technology patent was for an interactive television system that allowed users to click a button on their remote to perform near-real-time transactions over broadcast television. Palmer also invented and patented the methodology that enabled viewers to watch television and interact with server-based information in relative sync, known as two-screen interactive television. Major network broadcasts soon adopted this technology, including ABC's Monday Night Football, Who Wants to Be a Millionaire? and The Academy Awards.

As The Walt Disney Company and its subsidiaries licensed Palmer's Enhanced Television technology, the company soon hired Palmer as a consultant to their Enhanced Television division. In 2004, ABC's Celebrity Mole Yucatán received an Emmy Award in the category of Enhancement of Original Television Content, a project team of advanced media professionals spearheaded by Palmer.

== Books ==
- Palmer, Shelly (2006). Television Disrupted: The Transition from Network to Networked TV. Elsevier, Inc. p. 248. ISBN 978-0-240-80864-2.
- Palmer, Shelly (2008). Television Disrupted: The Transition from Network to Networked TV 2nd Edition. York House Press. p. 275. ISBN 978-0-9791956-3-1.
- Palmer, Shelly (2011). Overcoming the Digital Divide: How to use Social Media and Digital Tools to reinvent yourself and your career. York House Press. p. 136. ISBN 978-0-979-19567-9.
- Palmer, Shelly (2012). Digital Wisdom: Thought Leadership for a Connected World. York House Press. p. 152. ISBN 978-0-985-55082-0.
- Palmer, Shelly (2016). Data-Driven Thinking: A collection of essays about data-driven decision making. Digital Living Press. p. 65. ASIN B01AUF0IAG.
- Palmer, Shelly (2021). Blockchain - Cryptocurrency, NFTs & Smart Contracts: An executive guide to the world of decentralized finance. Digital Living Press. p. 59. ASIN B095C3GW6X.

== Patents ==
- US patent WO 1996038985 A1, Shelton Leigh Palmer, "Interactive television system for processing viewer responses", published 1996-12-05
- US patent US 5905865 A, Shelton Leigh Palmer, "Apparatus and method of automatically accessing on-line services in response to broadcast of on-line addresses", published 1999-05-18
- US patent US RE42103 E1, Shelton Leigh Palmer, "Apparatus and method of automatically accessing on-line services in response to broadcast of on-line addresses", published 12011-02-01
