= Reissner =

Reissner, also Reißner, is a German surname. Notable people with the surname include:

- Eric Reissner (1913–1996), German-American civil engineer, mathematician and academic
- Ernst Reissner (1824–1878), Baltic German anatomist
- Hans Reissner (1874–1967), German aeronautical engineer
- Larissa Reissner (1895–1926), Russian writer and revolutionary
- Lena Charlotte Reißner (born 2000), German professional racing cyclist

== See also ==
- Reissner–Mindlin plate theory, an extension of Kirchhoff–Love plate theory
- Reissner–Nordström metric, a static solution to the Einstein–Maxwell field equations
- Reissner's fiber, a fibrous aggregation of secreted molecules, named after Ernst Reissner
- Reisner, a surname
