= Rage syndrome =

Neurological problem in dogs

- Other names: A22, episodic dyscontrol, stimulus-responsive psychomotor epilepsy, Mental lapse aggression syndrome
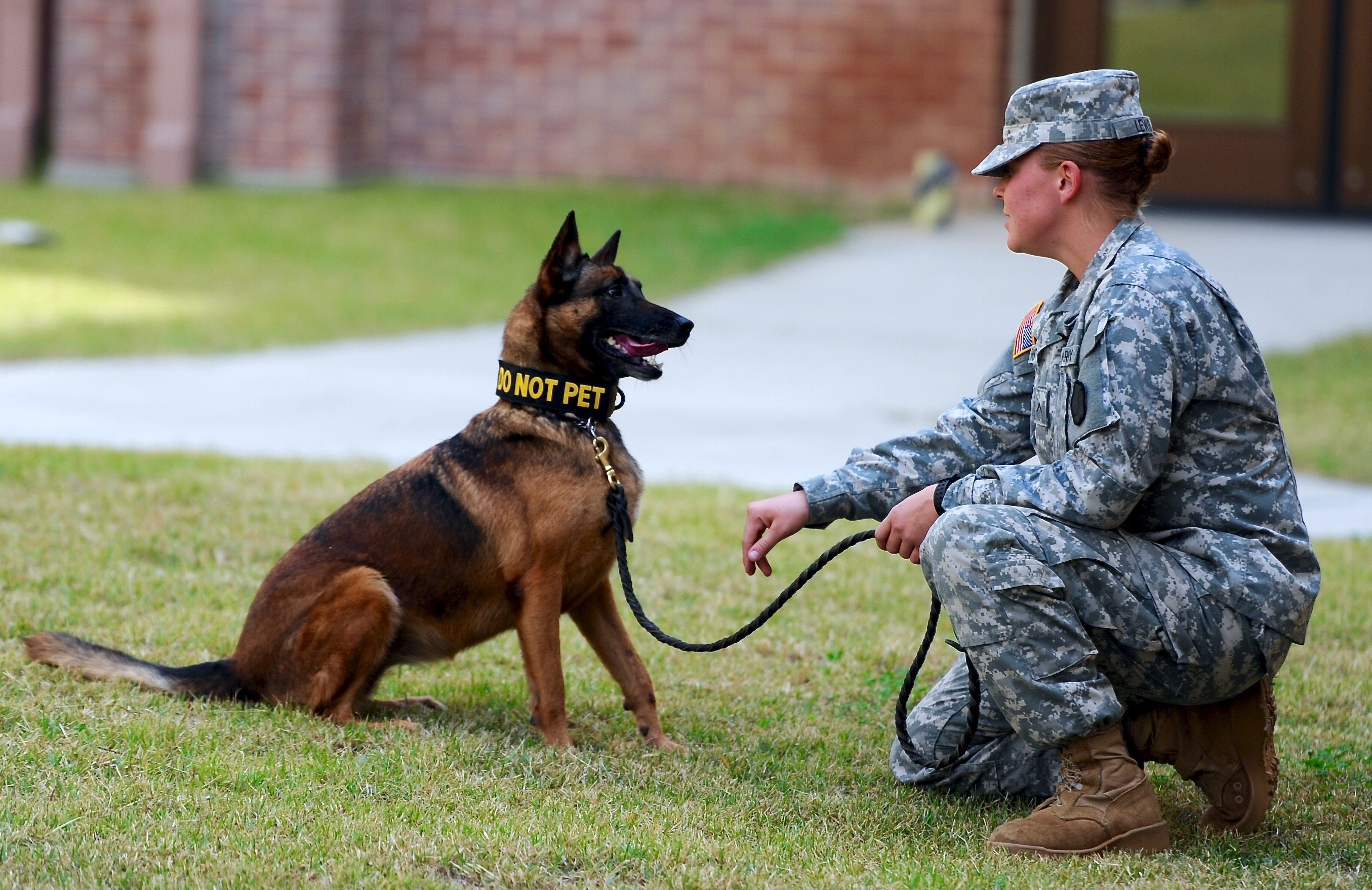
- The Malinois was the first breed to have a specific genetic polymorphism linked to rage syndrome.
- Specialty: Neurology
- Symptoms: Lethal dog attacks; Dog bites; Seizures
- Complications: Behavioral euthanasia
- Usual onset: 1–3 years old
- Duration: Lifelong
- Causes: Unknown
- Risk factors: PolyA(22) (in Malinois), DAT-VNTR (in Malinois), likely other genetic factors, breed, other seizures
- Diagnostic method: EEG, with complete exclusion of other medical conditions via thorough medical testing
- Differential diagnosis: Any untreated illness (Pathophysiological aggression) or behavioral condition
- Prevention: Selective breeding, Health testing (PolyA(22) test, in Malinois)
- Management: Anticonvulsants, muzzling, barrier use, lifestyle changes
- Medication: Antiepileptic drugs (Phenobarbital)
- Prognosis: Generally poor

Rage syndrome is a rare seizure disorder in dogs, characterized by explosive aggression.

It is frequently confused with idiopathic aggression, a term for aggression with no identifiable cause. Rage syndrome is most often a misdiagnosis of dogs with an unrelated, but more common, form of aggression. Although the scientific evidence is limited, it is thought to be genetic in origin, and is heritable. It is treated with antiepileptics.

== Names ==
Rage syndrome has been known by a variety of names since it was discovered. Rage syndrome is a colloquial term most often preferred by dog trainers, handlers, and some behavior consultants. Alternative names used by researchers, veterinary scientists, and behavior specialists include mental lapse syndrome (MLS) and episodic dyscontrol.

Rage syndrome is also sometimes termed a form of epilepsy, particularly limbic epilepsy. The term limbic epilepsy for rage syndrome has been used synonymously with the terms psychomotor epilepsy, automatic epilepsy, rhinencephalic epilepsy, behavioral epilepsy, temporal lobe epilepsy, and autonomic epilepsy. In addition, depending on the professional's discretion the word "seizure" may be substituted for "epilepsy" in a given study or resource. Edward B. Breitschwerdt, a researcher and veterinarian, wrote that this "profusion of synonyms makes it difficult to clearly ascertain the results of either clinical or research investigations of limbic epilepsy in the dog".

Rage syndrome is frequently confused with idiopathic aggression, a term for aggression with no identifiable cause, due to sharing a name with it in its earliest studies before being identified as a discrete condition. In early research rage syndrome was sometimes referred to as sudden-onset idiopathic aggression (SOIA) to distinguish it from idiopathic disease, and later as sudden-onset aggression (SOA).

Rage syndrome has no medical connection to rabies, for which its name is sometimes mistaken (from the Latin noun rabiēs, meaning "rage").

== Characteristics ==
Aggression in rage syndrome is characterized by its severity and often fatal to dogs, animals, or people it is targeted towards. Episodes may cause life-threatening injuries and result in disability or disfigurement.

Dogs with rage syndrome typically have their first rage episode during adolescence, between 1 and 3 years old, similar to dogs with idiopathic epilepsy.

Interictal EEGs under general anesthesia typically show low-voltage rapid discharges characteristic of focal seizures. Seizure foci are in the temporal lobe, most often the left temporal lobe.

== Outcomes ==
Prognosis for treatment of rage syndrome is guarded. It is treated with antiepileptics.

== Associated breeds ==
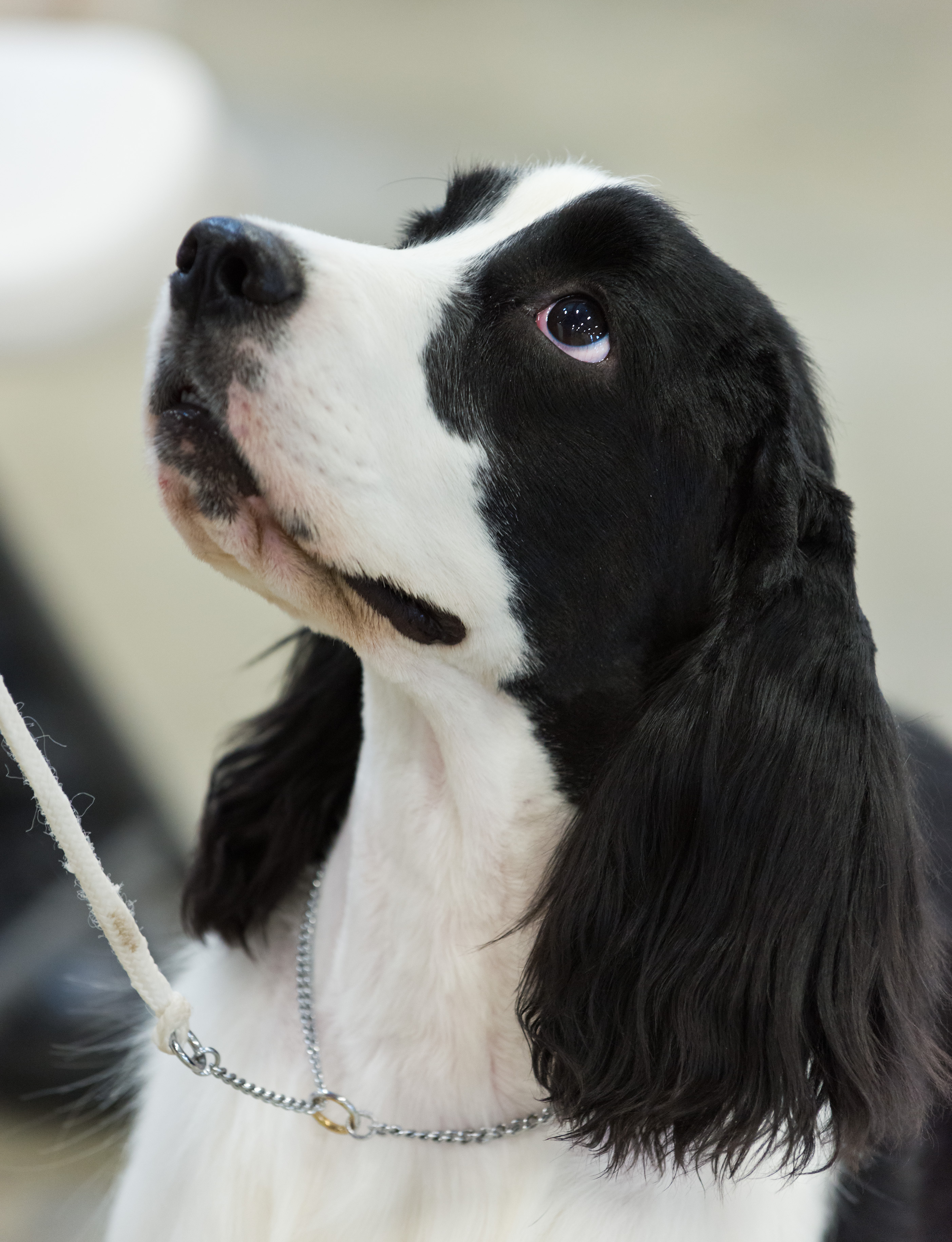
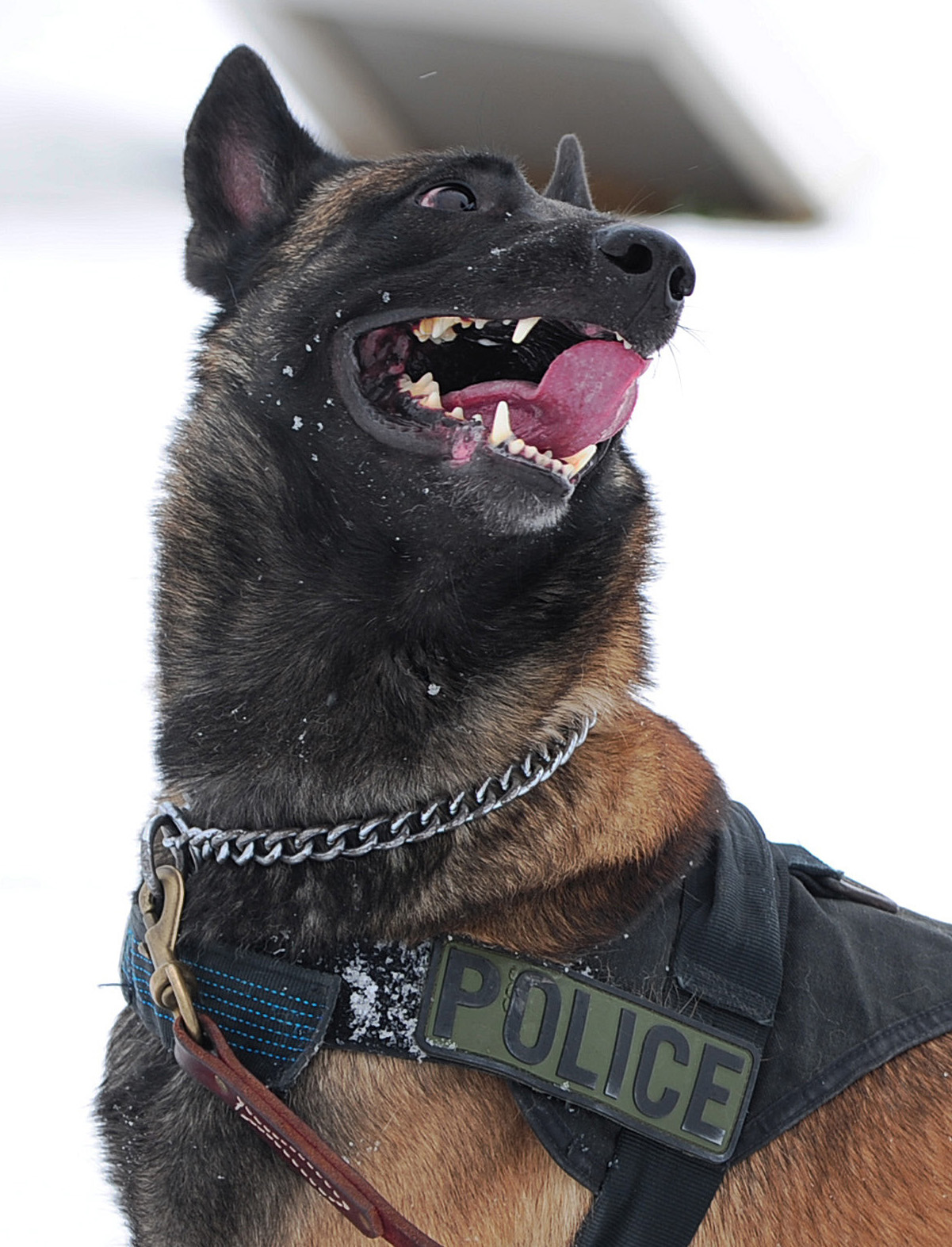
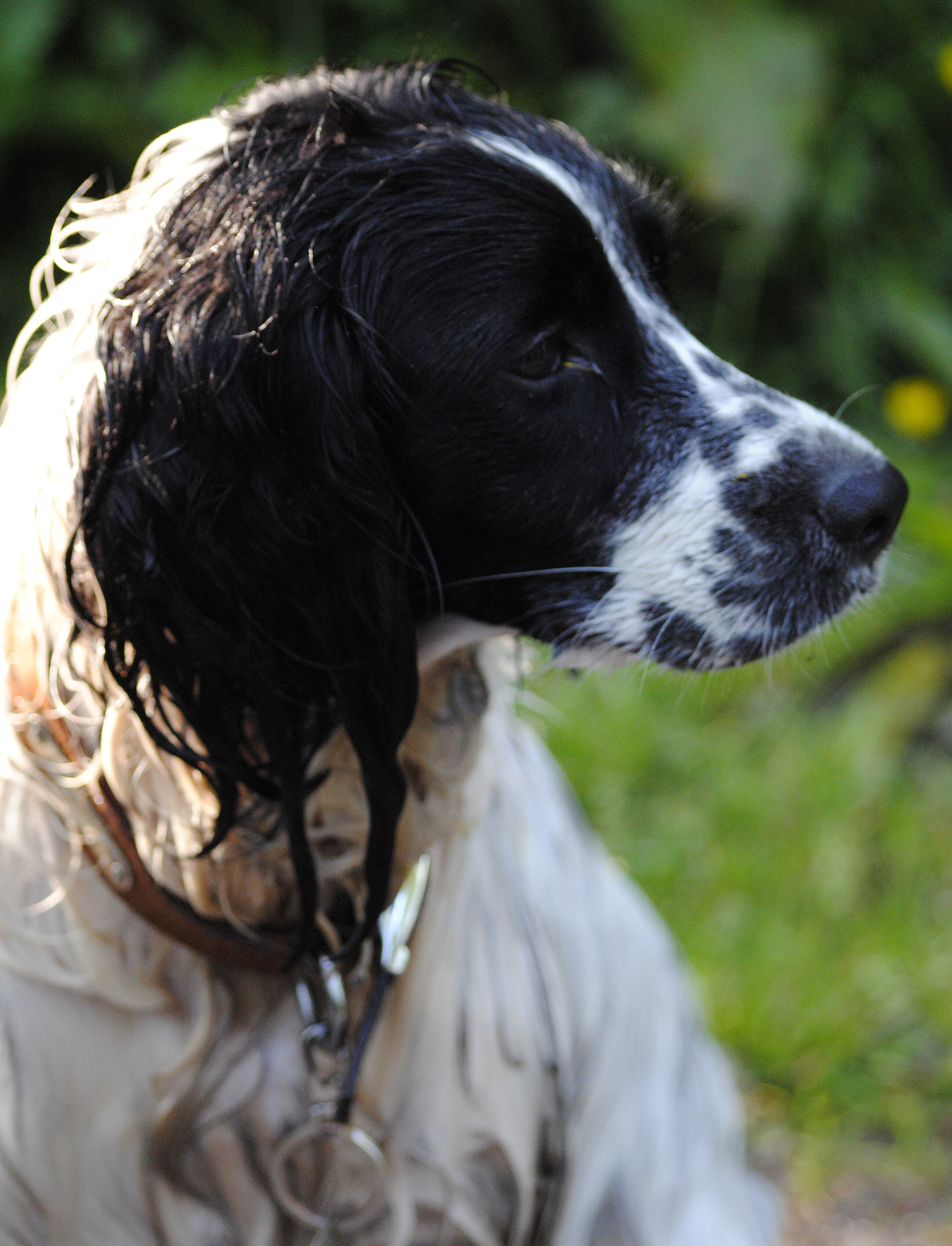
The English Cocker Spaniel, Belgian Malinois, and English Springer Spaniel have been associated with Rage syndrome.

=== English Springer Spaniel ===
The English Springer Spaniel is the origin of the term "Springer Rage" frequently used in the 1970s and 1980s.

English Springer Spaniels were the breed most often referred to dog behavior consultants for aggression in the 1980s.

Pat Miller wrote in Beware of the Dog: Positive Solutions for Aggressive Behavior in Dogs in 2017: "[Rage syndrome] captured the imagination of the dog world, and soon every dog with episodes of sudden, explosive aggression was tagged with the unfortunate "rage syndrome" label, especially if it was a Spaniel of any type."

=== Other breeds ===
Bull terriers have also been used in research studies on breed-specific hereditary focal seizures, sometimes including aggressive symptoms.

== Diagnosis ==
Rage syndrome is diagnosed by EEG.

Thyroid function is tested during typical diagnostic workups as thyroid conditions, most commonly hypo- and hyperthyroidism, have been suggested to cause pathophysiological aggression that may present similarly to Rage syndrome.

== In other animals ==
In 2002 a 4-month-old tigress was reported with symptoms analogous to rage syndrome. The tigress had episodes between 30 seconds and a minute long of explosive self-directed aggression and self-mutilation, in addition to occasional generalized tonic-clonic seizures and both focal and generalized neurologic symptoms such as episodes of continuously walking in circles to the right and epileptic blindness. Her EEG showed left frontal-temporal epileptiform activity, confirming a diagnosis of complex partial seizures. Cerebrospinal fluid testing, hematologic testing, serotologic testing, and serum biochemistry profile were all normal aside from faintly elevated CSF proteins. The tigress was the result of a consanguineous breeding and one of her littermates was diagnosed with generalized seizures. She was successfully treated with phenobarbital (2.5 mg/kg by mouth twice a day, bringing her within the therapeutic range at a blood concentration of 24 mg/dl).

== Superseded theories ==
In 1980 it was suggested that electroconvulsive therapy, prefrontal lobotomy, and partial cerebral hypoxia (hypoxic-anoxic brain injury) be used to treat rage syndrome. A 1974 study on prefrontal lobotomy of aggressive dogs found that 50% of lobotomized dogs died of complications. Surviving dogs developed seizures, fecal and urinary incontinence, confusion, memory loss, seromas, emotional dysregulation, focal neurologic symptoms, weakness, and weight loss. 40% of surviving dogs did not have a reduction in existing aggression, and some dogs' aggression worsened after the procedure. The treatments were described as heroic measures which caused further damage to the dogs' health but were undertaken as a last resort to preserve the lives of the dogs. Multiple dogs which did not die from the procedure itself were euthanized anyway.

== See also ==
- Phenobarbital
- List of fatal dog attacks
- Causes of seizures
- Animal euthanasia
