= Reisner =

Reisner is a surname of Germanic origin. Notable people with the surname include:

- Charles Reisner (1887–1952), American actor and film director
- George Andrew Reisner (1867–1942), American archaeologist
  - Reisner Papyrus, four 19th century BCE papyri discovered by Reisner
- Hermann E. Reisner (1910–2002), German entrepreneur, publisher and author
- Lea Reisner (born 1989), German politician
- Marc Reisner (1948–2000), American environmentalist
- Mikhail Reisner (1868–1928), Russian and Soviet jurist, writer, social psychologist and historian

== See also ==
- Reissner, a German surname
