= List of reference ranges for cerebrospinal fluid =

Following is a list of reference ranges for cerebrospinal fluid:

== Ions and metals ==
Reference ranges for ions and metals in CSF
| Substance | Lower limit | Upper limit | Unit | Corresponds to % of that in plasma |
|---|---|---|---|---|
| Osmolality | 280 | 300 | mmol/L | |
| Sodium | 135 | 150 | mmol/L | |
| Potassium | 2.6 | 3.0 | mmol/L | |
| Chloride | 115 | 130 | mmol/L | >100% |
| Calcium | 1.00 | 1.40 | mmol/L | ~50% |
| Magnesium | 1.2 | 1.5 | mmol/L | >100% |
| Iron | 0.2 | 0.4 | μmol/L | |

== Other molecules ==
Reference ranges for other molecules in CSF
| Substance | Lower limit | Upper limit | Unit | Corresponds to % of that in plasma |
|---|---|---|---|---|
| Glucose | 50 | 80 | mg/dL | ~60% |
| Glucose | 2.2, 2.8 | 3.9, 4.4 | mmol/L | ~60% |
| Protein | 15 | 40, 45 | mg/dL | ~1% |
| Albumin | 7.8 | 40 | mg/dL | 0 - 0.7%: corresponding to an albumin (CSF/serum) quotient of 0 to 7 × 10^{−3} |
| Lactate | 1.1 | 2.4 | mmol/L | |
| Creatinine | 50 | 110 | μmol/L | |
| Phosphorus | 0.4 | 0.6 | μmol/L | |
| Urea | 3.0 | 6.5 | mmol/L | |
| Carbon dioxide | 20 | 25 | mmol/L | |

== Other CSF constituents ==
Reference ranges for other CSF constituents
| Substance | Lower limit | Upper limit | Unit | Corresponds to % of that in blood plasma |
|---|---|---|---|---|
| RBCs | n/a | 0 / negative | cells/μL or cells/mm^{3} | |
| WBCs | 0 | 3 | cells/μL cells/mm^{3} | |
| pH | 7.28 | 7.32 | (-log M) | |
| PCO_{2} | 44 | 50 | mmHg | |
| PCO_{2} | 5.9 | 6.7 | kPa | |
| PO_{2} | 40 | 44 | mmHg | |
| PO_{2} | 5.3 | 5.9 | kPa | |
