= SCO-spondin =

SSPOP

Identifiers
- Aliases: SSPOP, SCO-spondin, SCO-spondin, pseudogene, SSPO
- External IDs: OMIM: 617356; MGI: 2674311; GeneCards: SSPOP

Gene location (Human)
Chr.	Chromosome 7 (human)
Band	7q36.1	Start	149,776,042 bp
Band	7q36.1	End	149,833,979 bp

Gene location (Mouse)
Chr.	Chromosome 6 (mouse)
Band	6|6 B2.3	Start	48,425,163 bp
Band	6|6 B2.3	End	48,478,184 bp
Gene ontology
Molecular function	peptidase inhibitor activity
Cellular component	extracellular region; extracellular space
Biological process	negative regulation of peptidase activity; cell adhesion; nervous system development; cell differentiation
Sources:Amigo / QuickGO
Orthologs
Databases	NCBI: entry; OMA: entry
Species	Human	Mouse
Entrez	23145	243369
Ensembl	ENSG00000197558	ENSMUSG00000029797
UniProt	A2VEC9	Q8CG65
RefSeq (mRNA)	NM_198455	NM_173428
RefSeq (protein)	NP_940857	NP_775604
Location (UCSC)	Chr 7: 149.78 – 149.83 Mb	Chr 6: 48.43 – 48.48 Mb
PubMed search
- Wikidata
View/Edit Human	View/Edit Mouse

SCO-Spondin is a large protein that exists in most chordates and is encoded in humans by the SSPO gene. SCO-Spondin is a glycoprotein which is over 550 kDa in size. SCO-Spondin is a matricellular protein, secreted by the subcommissural organ (SCO) located beneath the posterior commissure located at the entrance of the Sylvian aqueduct, into the cerebrospinal fluid (CSF). SCO-spondin has the binding features of an LDL-binding protein. SCO-spondin has been characterized in zebrafish, mouse, and birds.

== Functions ==
SCO-spondin's function is incompletely characterized, but is believed to be involved in formation of Reissner's fibers (RF). This process involves a continuous deposition, aggregation and disaggregation of the SCO-spondin along the RF length.

Early in development, SCO-spondin also plays a role in modulation of neural differentiation. The secretion of SCO-spondin influences the rate of RF growth, which varies considerably between species.

Human SCO-spondin is poorly researched, and any role in adult human brains remains unknown. It has been observed in the fetal and infancy stages of humans.

== Domains and structure ==
SCO-spondin contains dozens of tandem domains, including thrombospondin-like repeat (TSR), vWF-C, EGF-like, and LDL receptor A. It also includes an elastin microfibril interface (EMI) domain at the N-terminus and a C-terminal cystine knot (CTCK) domain at the C-terminus.

The TSR domains, found in many matricelluar proteins, function in cell attachment, protein to protein interactions, and protein-glycoaminoglycan interactions. There are many molecules that can interact with this domain including FGF-2. The vWF-C domain is a 'chordin like cysteine rich repeat', which plays a role in regulating TGF-β and other proteins. The CTCK domain is responsible for cell adhesion and protein-protein interactions, possibly suggesting a role of SCO-spondin in forming intermolecular aggregates with other CSF proteins containing this domain. The EGF-like domains are thought to associate with integrins and cell-surface receptors such as the EGF receptor, and the LDL-r A domains are thought to bind to the same binding partners as the LDL receptor, including low-density lipoprotein, amyloid-β, reelin, and clusterin, all of which can be found in the CSF under some conditions.

In addition to these domains, SCO-spondin contains an EMI domain, thought to enable multimer formation by disulfide bonding, 12 or more trypsin inhibitor-like (TIL) domains, and multiple vWF-D domains. These latter domains are thought to be involved in formation of intermolecular networks with other CSF proteins.

In zebrafish, the voltage gated potassium channel Kv2.1 can regulate the assembly of SCO-spondin and its bundling into the Reissner fibers.

== History ==
SCO-spondin was first discovered in 1996 and then was later sequenced in 2000. In humans, the gene that codes for SCO-spondin, SSPO or SSPOP, is classified as a pseudogene, not encoding a working protein. However, irregular SCO-spondin expression has been identified in humans and the protein's secretion has been linked to various disease states.
