= Cerebrospinal fluid =

Clear, colorless bodily fluid found in the brain and spinal cord

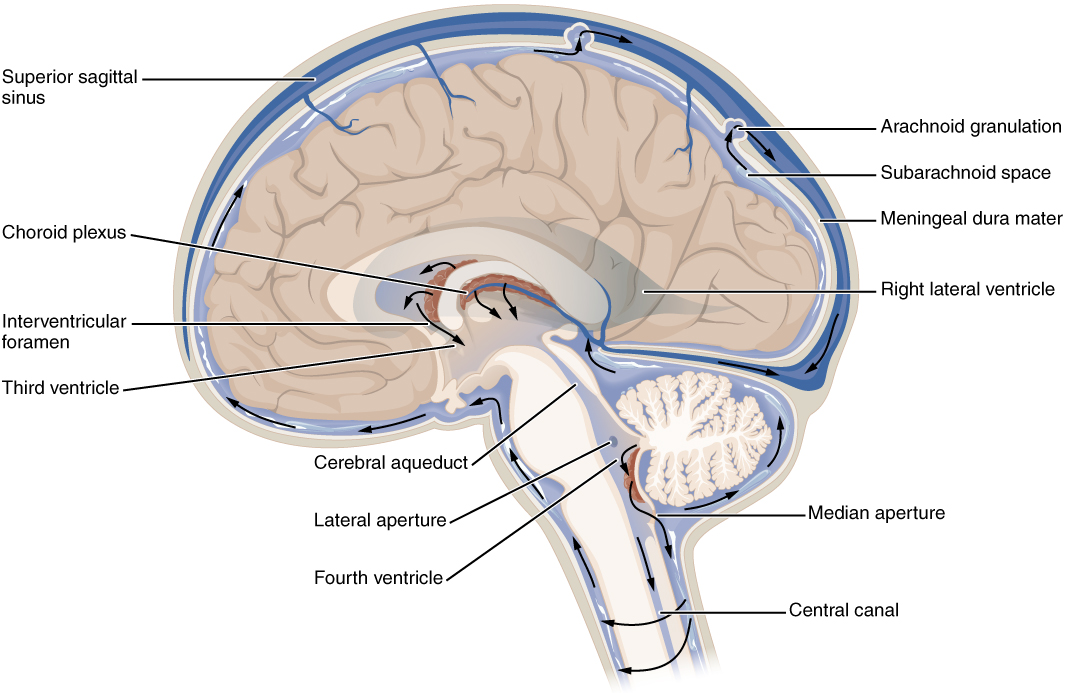
- The cerebrospinal fluid circulates in the subarachnoid space around the brain and spinal cord, and in the ventricles of the brain.

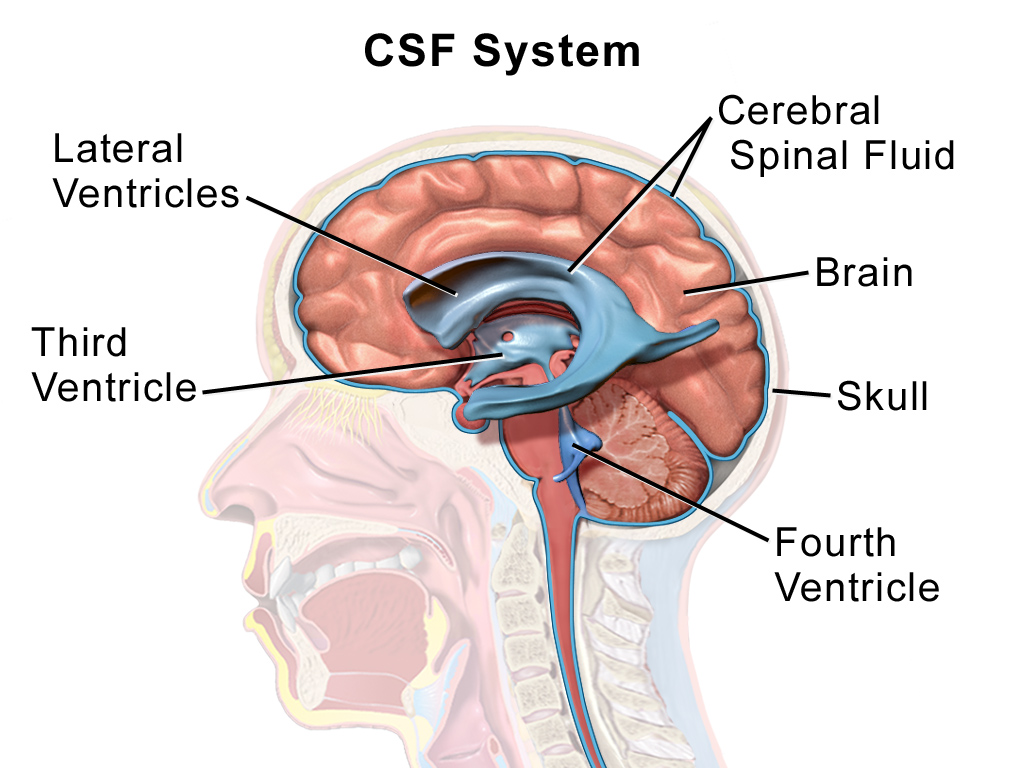
- Image showing the location of CSF highlighting the brain's ventricular system

Details

Identifiers
- Latin: liquor cerebrospinalis
- Acronym: CSF
- MeSH: D002555
- TA98: A14.1.01.203
- TA2: 5388

Cerebrospinal fluid (CSF) is a clear, colorless transcellular body fluid found within the meningeal tissue that surrounds the vertebrate, brain and spinal cord, and in the ventricles of the brain.

CSF is mostly produced by the epithelial cells in the choroid plexuses of the ventricles of the brain, and absorbed in the arachnoid granulations. In humans, there is about 125 mL of CSF at any one time, and about 500 mL is generated every day. CSF acts as a shock absorber, cushion or buffer, providing basic mechanical and immunological protection to the brain inside the skull. CSF also serves a vital function in the cerebral autoregulation of cerebral blood flow.

CSF occupies the subarachnoid space (between the arachnoid mater and the pia mater) and the ventricular system around and inside the brain and spinal cord. It fills the ventricles of the brain, cisterns, and sulci, as well as the central canal of the spinal cord. There is also a connection from the subarachnoid space to the bony labyrinth of the inner ear via the perilymphatic duct where the perilymph is continuous with the cerebrospinal fluid. The ependymal cells of the choroid plexus have multiple motile cilia on their apical surfaces that beat to move the CSF through the ventricles.

A sample of CSF can be taken from around the spinal cord via lumbar puncture. This can be used to test the intracranial pressure, as well as indicate diseases including infections of the brain or the surrounding meninges.

Although noted by Hippocrates, it was forgotten for centuries, though later was described in the 18th century by Emanuel Swedenborg. In 1914, Harvey Cushing demonstrated that CSF is secreted by the choroid plexus.

== Structure ==
=== Circulation ===
MRI showing pulsation of CSF

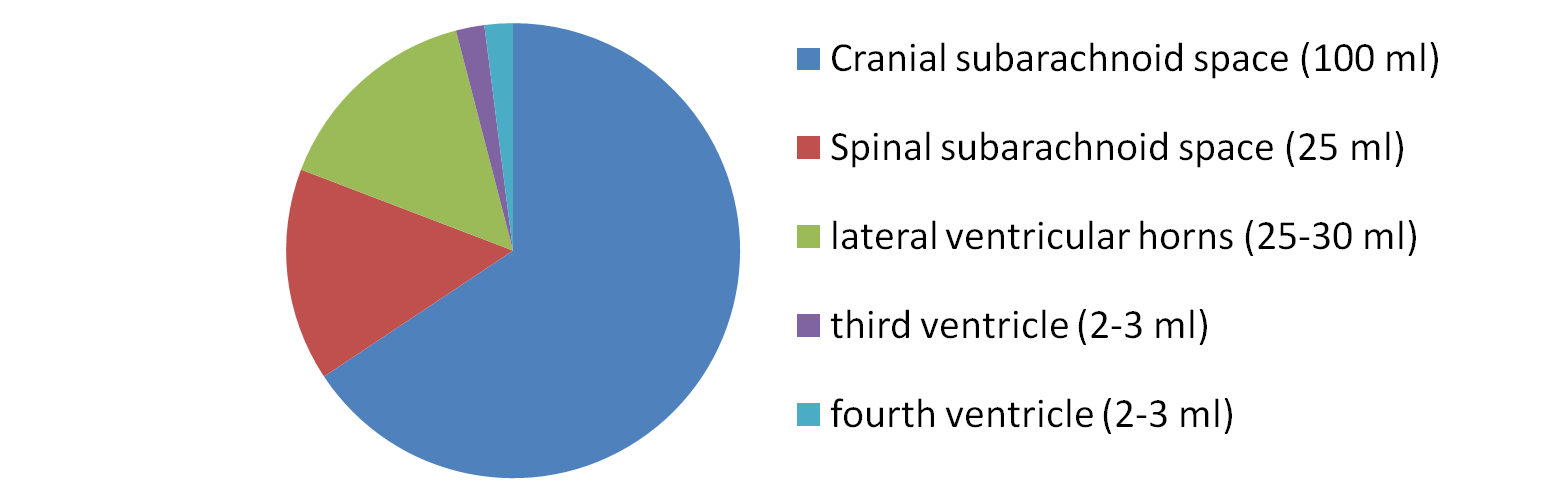
Distribution of CSF

In humans, there is about 125–150 mL of CSF at any one time. This CSF circulates within the ventricular system of the brain. The ventricles are a series of cavities filled with CSF. The majority of CSF is produced from within the two lateral ventricles. From here, CSF passes through the interventricular foramina to the third ventricle, then the cerebral aqueduct to the fourth ventricle. From the fourth ventricle, the fluid passes into the subarachnoid space through four openings – the central canal of the spinal cord, the median aperture, and the two lateral apertures. CSF is present within the subarachnoid space, which covers the brain and spinal cord, and stretches below the end of the spinal cord to the sacrum. There is a connection from the subarachnoid space to the bony labyrinth of the inner ear making the cerebrospinal fluid continuous with the perilymph in 93% of people.

CSF moves in a single outward direction from the ventricles, but multidirectionally in the subarachnoid space. The flow of cerebrospinal fluid is pulsatile, driven by the cardiac cycle. The flow of CSF through perivascular spaces in the brain (surrounding the cerebral arteries) is obtained through the pumping movements of the walls of the arteries.

=== Contents ===
CSF is derived from blood plasma and is largely similar to it, except that CSF is nearly protein-free compared with plasma and has some different electrolyte levels. Due to the way it is produced, CSF has a lower chloride level than plasma, and a higher sodium level.

CSF contains approximately 0.59% plasma proteins, or approximately 15 to 40 mg/dL, depending on sampling site. In general, globular proteins and albumin are in lower concentration in ventricular CSF compared to lumbar or cisternal fluid. This continuous flow into the venous system dilutes the concentration of larger, lipid-insoluble molecules penetrating the brain and CSF. CSF is normally free of red blood cells and at most contains fewer than 5 white blood cells per mm^{3} (if the white cell count is higher than this it constitutes pleocytosis and can indicate inflammation or infection).

== Development ==
At around the fifth week of its development, the embryo is a three-layered disc, covered with ectoderm, mesoderm and endoderm. A tube-like formation develops in the midline, called the notochord. The notochord releases extracellular molecules that affect the transformation of the overlying ectoderm into nervous tissue. The neural tube, forming from the ectoderm, contains CSF prior to the development of the choroid plexuses. The open neuropores of the neural tube close after the first month of development, and CSF pressure gradually increases.

By the fourth week of embryonic development the brain has begun to develop. Three swellings (primary brain vesicles), have formed within the embryo around the canal, near to where the head will develop. These swellings represent different components of the central nervous system: the prosencephalon (forebrain), mesencephalon (midbrain), and rhombencephalon (hindbrain). Subarachnoid spaces are first evident around the 32nd day of development near the rhombencephalon; circulation is visible from the 41st day. At this time, the first choroid plexus can be seen, found in the fourth ventricle, although the time at which they first secrete CSF is not yet known.

The developing forebrain surrounds the neural cord. As the forebrain develops, the neural cord within it becomes a ventricle, ultimately forming the lateral ventricles. Along the inner surface of both ventricles, the ventricular wall remains thin, and a choroid plexus develops, producing and releasing CSF. CSF quickly fills the neural canal. Arachnoid villi are formed around the 35th week of development, with arachnoid granulations noted around the 39th, and continuing developing until 18 months of age.

The subcommissural organ secretes SCO-spondin, which forms Reissner's fiber within CSF assisting movement through the cerebral aqueduct. It is present in early intrauterine life but disappears during early development.

== Physiology ==
=== Function ===
CSF serves several purposes:

1. Buoyancy: The actual mass of the human brain is about 1400–1500 grams, but its net weight suspended in CSF is equivalent to a mass of 25–50 g. The brain therefore exists in neutral buoyancy, which allows the brain to maintain its density without being impaired by its own weight, which would cut off blood supply and kill neurons in the lower sections without CSF.
2. Protection: CSF protects the brain tissue from injury when jolted or hit, by providing a fluid buffer that acts as a shock absorber from some forms of mechanical injury.
3. Prevention of brain ischemia: The prevention of brain ischemia is aided by decreasing the amount of CSF in the limited space inside the skull. This decreases total intracranial pressure and facilitates blood perfusion.
4. Regulation: CSF allows for the homeostatic regulation of the distribution of substances between cells of the brain, and neuroendocrine factors, to which slight changes can cause problems or damage to the nervous system. For example, high glycine concentration disrupts temperature and blood pressure control, and high CSF pH causes dizziness and fainting.
5. Clearing waste: CSF allows for the removal of waste products from the brain, and is critical in the brain's lymphatic system, called the glymphatic system. Metabolic waste products diffuse rapidly into CSF and are removed into the bloodstream as CSF is absorbed. When this goes awry, CSF can become toxic, such as in amyotrophic lateral sclerosis, the most common form of motor neuron disease.

=== Production ===
Comparison of serum and cerebrospinal fluid
Substance	CSF	Serum
Water content (% wt)	99	93
Protein (mg/dL)	35	7000
Glucose (mg/dL)	60	90
Osmolarity (mOsm/L)	295	295
Sodium (mEq/L)	138	138
Potassium (mEq/L)	2.8	4.5
Calcium (mEq/L)	2.1	4.8
Magnesium (mEq/L)	2.0–2.5	1.7
Chloride (mEq/L)	119	102
pH	7.33	7.41
Further information: List of reference ranges for cerebrospinal fluid

The brain produces roughly 500 mL of cerebrospinal fluid per day at a rate of about 20 mL an hour. This extracellular fluid is constantly reabsorbed, so that only 125–150 mL is present at any one time.

CSF volume is higher on a mL per kg body weight basis in children compared to adults. Infants have a CSF volume of 4 mL/kg, children have a CSF volume of 3 mL/kg, and adults have a CSF volume of 1.5–2 mL/kg. A high CSF volume is why a larger dose of local anesthetic, on a mL/kg basis, is needed in infants. Additionally, the larger CSF volume may be one reason as to why children have lower rates of postdural puncture headache.

Most (about two-thirds to 80%) of CSF is produced by the choroid plexus. The choroid plexus is a network of blood vessels present within sections of the four ventricles of the brain. It is present throughout the ventricular system except for the cerebral aqueduct, and the frontal and occipital horns of the lateral ventricles. CSF is mostly produced by the lateral ventricles. CSF is also produced by the single layer of column-shaped ependymal cells which line the ventricles; by the lining surrounding the subarachnoid space; and a small amount directly from the tiny spaces surrounding blood vessels around the brain.

CSF is produced by the choroid plexus in two steps. Firstly, a filtered form of plasma moves from fenestrated capillaries in the choroid plexus into an interstitial space, with movement guided by a difference in pressure between the blood in the capillaries and the interstitial fluid. This fluid then needs to pass through the epithelium cells lining the choroid plexus into the ventricles, an active process requiring the transport of sodium, potassium and chloride that draws water into CSF by creating osmotic pressure. Unlike blood passing from the capillaries into the choroid plexus, the epithelial cells lining the choroid plexus contain tight junctions between cells, which act to prevent most substances flowing freely into CSF. Cilia on the apical surfaces of the ependymal cells beat to help transport the CSF.

Water and carbon dioxide from the interstitial fluid diffuse into the epithelial cells. Within these cells, carbonic anhydrase converts the substances into bicarbonate and hydrogen ions. These are exchanged for sodium and chloride on the cell surface facing the interstitium. Sodium, chloride, bicarbonate and potassium are then actively secreted into the ventricular lumen. This creates osmotic pressure and draws water into CSF, facilitated by aquaporins. CSF contains many fewer protein anions than blood plasma. Protein in the blood is primarily composed of anions where each anion has many negative charges on it. As a result, to maintain electroneutrality blood plasma has a much lower concentration of chloride anions than sodium cations. CSF contains a similar concentration of sodium ions to blood plasma but fewer protein cations and therefore a smaller imbalance between sodium and chloride resulting in a higher concentration of chloride ions than plasma. This creates an osmotic pressure difference with the plasma. CSF has less potassium, calcium, glucose and protein. Choroid plexuses also secrete growth factors, iodine, vitamins B_{1}, B_{12}, C, folate, beta-2 microglobulin, arginine vasopressin and nitric oxide into CSF. A Na-K-Cl cotransporter and Na/K ATPase found on the surface of the choroid endothelium, appears to play a role in regulating CSF secretion and composition. It has been hypothesised that CSF is not primarily produced by the choroid plexus, but is being permanently produced inside the entire CSF system, as a consequence of water filtration through the capillary walls into the interstitial fluid of the surrounding brain tissue, regulated by AQP-4.

There are circadian variations in CSF secretion, with the mechanisms not fully understood, but potentially relating to differences in the activation of the autonomic nervous system over the course of the day.

Choroid plexus of the lateral ventricle produces CSF from the arterial blood provided by the anterior choroidal artery. In the fourth ventricle, CSF is produced from the arterial blood from the anterior inferior cerebellar artery (cerebellopontine angle and the adjacent part of the lateral recess), the posterior inferior cerebellar artery (roof and median opening), and the superior cerebellar artery.

=== Reabsorption ===
CSF returns to the vascular system by entering the dural venous sinuses via arachnoid granulations. These are outpouchings of the arachnoid mater into the venous sinuses around the brain, with valves to ensure one-way drainage. This occurs because of a pressure difference between the arachnoid mater and venous sinuses. CSF has also been seen to drain into lymphatic vessels, particularly those surrounding the nose via drainage along the olfactory nerve through the cribriform plate. The pathway and extent are currently not known, but may involve CSF flow along some cranial nerves and be more prominent in the neonate. CSF turns over at a rate of three to four times a day. CSF has also been seen to be reabsorbed through the sheathes of cranial and spinal nerve sheathes, and through the ependyma.

=== Regulation ===
The composition and rate of CSF generation are influenced by hormones and the content and pressure of blood and CSF. For example, when CSF pressure is higher, there is less of a pressure difference between the capillary blood in choroid plexuses and CSF, decreasing the rate at which fluids move into the choroid plexus and CSF generation. The autonomic nervous system influences choroid plexus CSF secretion, with activation of the sympathetic nervous system decreasing secretion and the parasympathetic nervous system increasing it. Changes in the pH of the blood can affect the activity of carbonic anhydrase, and some drugs (such as furosemide, acting on the Na-K-Cl cotransporter) have the potential to impact membrane channels.

== Clinical significance ==
=== Pressure ===
CSF pressure, as measured by lumbar puncture, is 10–18 cmH_{2}O (8–15 mmHg or 1.1–2 kPa) with the patient lying on the side and 20–30 cmH_{2}O (16–24 mmHg or 2.1–3.2 kPa) with the patient sitting up. In newborns, CSF pressure ranges from 8 to 10 cmH_{2}O (4.4–7.3 mmHg or 0.78–0.98 kPa). Most variations are due to coughing or internal compression of jugular veins in the neck. When lying down, the CSF pressure as estimated by lumbar puncture is similar to the intracranial pressure.

Hydrocephalus is an abnormal accumulation of CSF in the ventricles of the brain. Hydrocephalus can occur because of obstruction of the passage of CSF, such as from an infection, injury, mass, or congenital abnormality. Hydrocephalus without obstruction associated with normal CSF pressure may also occur. Symptoms can include problems with gait and coordination, urinary incontinence, nausea and vomiting, and progressively impaired cognition. In infants, hydrocephalus can cause an enlarged head, as the bones of the skull have not yet fused, seizures, irritability and drowsiness. A CT scan or MRI scan may reveal enlargement of one or both lateral ventricles, or causative masses or lesions, and lumbar puncture may be used to demonstrate and in some circumstances relieve high intracranial pressure. Hydrocephalus is usually treated through the insertion of a shunt, such as a ventriculo-peritoneal shunt, which diverts fluid to another part of the body.

Idiopathic intracranial hypertension is a condition of unknown cause characterized by a rise in CSF pressure. It is associated with headaches, double vision, difficulties seeing, and a swollen optic disc. It can occur in association with the use of vitamin A and tetracycline antibiotics, or without any identifiable cause at all, particularly in younger obese women. Management may include ceasing any known causes, a carbonic anhydrase inhibitor such as acetazolamide, repeated drainage via lumbar puncture, or the insertion of a shunt such as a ventriculo-peritoneal shunt.

=== CSF leak ===
CSF can leak from the dura as a result of different causes such as physical trauma or a lumbar puncture, or from no known cause when it is termed a spontaneous cerebrospinal fluid leak. It is usually associated with intracranial hypotension: low CSF pressure. It can cause headaches, made worse by standing, moving and coughing, as the low CSF pressure causes the brain to "sag" downwards and put pressure on its lower structures. If a leak is identified, a beta-2 transferrin test of the leaking fluid, when positive, is highly specific and sensitive for the detection for CSF leakage. Medical imaging such as CT scans and MRI scans can be used to investigate for a presumed CSF leak when no obvious leak is found but low CSF pressure is identified. Caffeine, given either orally or intravenously, often offers symptomatic relief. Treatment of an identified leak may include injection of a person's blood into the epidural space (an epidural blood patch), spinal surgery, or fibrin glue.

=== Lumbar puncture ===
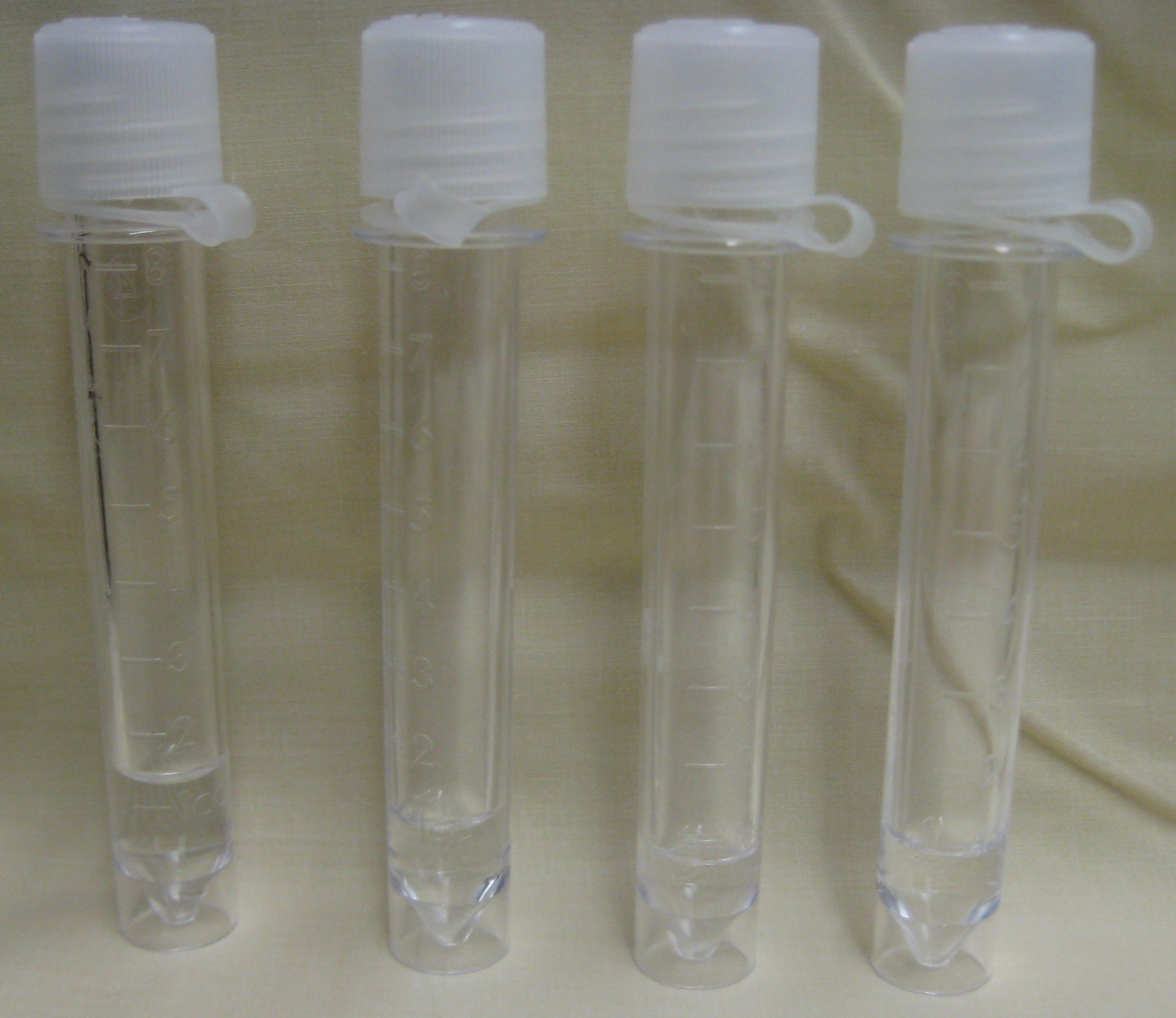
Vials containing human cerebrospinal fluid

CSF can be tested for the diagnosis of a variety of neurological diseases, usually obtained by a procedure called lumbar puncture. Lumbar puncture is carried out under sterile conditions by inserting a needle into the subarachnoid space, usually between the third and fourth lumbar vertebrae. CSF is extracted through the needle, and tested. About one third of people experience a headache after lumbar puncture, and pain or discomfort at the needle entry site is common. Rarer complications may include bruising, meningitis or ongoing post lumbar-puncture leakage of CSF.

Testing often includes observing the colour of the fluid, measuring CSF pressure, and counting and identifying white and red blood cells within the fluid; measuring protein and glucose levels; and culturing the fluid. The presence of red blood cells and xanthochromia may indicate subarachnoid hemorrhage; whereas central nervous system infections such as meningitis, may be indicated by elevated white blood cell levels. A CSF culture may yield the microorganism that has caused the infection, or PCR may be used to identify a viral cause. Investigations to the total type and nature of proteins reveal point to specific diseases, including multiple sclerosis, paraneoplastic syndromes, systemic lupus erythematosus, neurosarcoidosis, cerebral angiitis; and specific antibodies such as aquaporin-4 may be tested for to assist in the diagnosis of autoimmune conditions. A lumbar puncture that drains CSF may also be used as part of treatment for some conditions, including idiopathic intracranial hypertension and normal pressure hydrocephalus.

Lumbar puncture can also be performed to measure the intracranial pressure, which might be increased in certain types of hydrocephalus. However, a lumbar puncture should never be performed if increased intracranial pressure is suspected due to certain situations such as a tumour, because it can lead to fatal brain herniation.

=== Anesthesia and chemotherapy ===
Some anesthetics and chemotherapy drugs are injected intrathecally into the subarachnoid space, where they spread around CSF, meaning substances that cannot cross the blood–brain barrier can still be active throughout the central nervous system. Baricity refers to the density of a substance compared to the density of human cerebrospinal fluid and is used in regional anesthesia to determine the manner in which a particular drug will spread in the intrathecal space.

=== Liquorpheresis ===
Liquorpheresis is the process of filtering the CSF in order to clear it from endogen or exogen pathogens. It can be achieved by means of fully implantable or extracorporeal devices, though the technique remains experimental today.

=== CSF drug delivery ===
CSF drug delivery refers to a number of methods designed to administer therapeutic agents directly into the CSF, bypassing the BBB to achieve higher drug concentrations in the CNS. This technique is particularly beneficial for treating neurological disorders such as brain tumors, infections, and neurodegenerative diseases. Intrathecal injection, where drugs are injected directly into the CSF via the lumbar region, and intracerebroventricular injection, targeting the brain's ventricles, are common approaches. These methods ensure that drugs can reach the CNS more effectively than systemic administration, potentially improving therapeutic outcomes and reducing systemic side effects. Advances in this field are driven by ongoing research into novel delivery systems and drug formulations, enhancing the precision and efficacy of treatments. Intrathecal pseudodelivery refers to a particular drug delivery method where the therapeutic agent is introduced into a reservoir connected to the intrathecal space, rather than being released into the CSF and distributed throughout the CNS. In this approach, the drug interacts with its target within the reservoir, allowing for changing the composition of the CSF without systemic release. This method can be advantageous for maximizing efficacy and minimizing systemic side effects.

== History ==
Various comments by ancient physicians have been read as referring to CSF. Hippocrates discussed "water" surrounding the brain when describing congenital hydrocephalus, and Galen referred to "excremental liquid" in the ventricles of the brain, which he believed was purged into the nose. But for some 16 intervening centuries of ongoing anatomical study, CSF remained unmentioned in the literature. This is perhaps because of the prevailing autopsy technique, which involved cutting off the head, thereby removing evidence of CSF before the brain was examined.

The modern rediscovery of CSF is credited to Emanuel Swedenborg. In a manuscript written between 1741 and 1744, unpublished in his lifetime, Swedenborg referred to CSF as "spirituous lymph" secreted from the roof of the fourth ventricle down to the medulla oblongata and spinal cord. This manuscript was eventually published in translation in 1887.

Albrecht von Haller, a Swiss physician and physiologist, made note in his 1747 book on physiology that the "water" in the brain was secreted into the ventricles and absorbed in the veins, and when secreted in excess, could lead to hydrocephalus. François Magendie studied the properties of CSF by vivisection. He discovered the foramen Magendie, the opening in the roof of the fourth ventricle, but mistakenly believed that CSF was secreted by the pia mater.

Thomas Willis (noted as the discoverer of the circle of Willis) made note of the fact that the consistency of CSF is altered in meningitis. In 1869 Gustav Schwalbe proposed that CSF drainage could occur via lymphatic vessels.

In 1891, W. Essex Wynter began treating tubercular meningitis by removing CSF from the subarachnoid space, and Heinrich Quincke began to popularize lumbar puncture, which he advocated for both diagnostic and therapeutic purposes. In 1912, a neurologist William Mestrezat gave the first accurate description of the chemical composition of CSF. In 1914, Harvey W. Cushing published conclusive evidence that CSF is secreted by the choroid plexus.

== Other animals ==
During phylogenesis, CSF is present within the neuraxis before it circulates. The CSF of teleost fish, which do not have a subarachnoid space, is contained within the ventricles of their brains. In mammals, where a subarachnoid space is present, CSF is present in it. Absorption of CSF is seen in amniotes and more complex species, and as species become progressively more complex, the system of absorption becomes progressively more enhanced, and the role of spinal epidural veins in absorption plays a progressively smaller and smaller role.

The amount of cerebrospinal fluid varies by size and species. In humans and other mammals, cerebrospinal fluid turns over at a rate of 3–5 times a day. Problems with CSF circulation, leading to hydrocephalus, can occur in other animals as well as humans.

== See also ==
- Body fluid
- Biofluid dynamics
- Neuroglobin
- Pandy's test
- Reissner's fiber
- Syrinx (medicine)
