= Reissner's fiber =

Spinal fiber

Reissner's fiber (named after Ernst Reissner) is a fibrous aggregation of secreted molecules extending from the subcommissural organ (SCO) through the ventricular system and central canal to the terminal ventricle, a small ventricle-like structure near the end of the spinal cord. In vertebrates, Reissner's fiber is formed by secretions of SCO-spondin from the subcommissural organ into the ventricular cerebrospinal fluid. Reissner's fiber is highly conserved, and present in the central canal of all chordates. In cephalochordates, Reissner's fiber is produced by the ventral infundibular organ, as opposed to the dorsal SCO.

== Structure ==
Reissner’s fiber (RF) is a complex and dynamic structure present in the third and fourth ventricles and in the central canal of the spinal cord, observed in almost all vertebrates.

It is formed by the assembly of complex and variable high-weight molecular glycoproteins secreted by the SCO that are released to the cerebrospinal fluid. At least five different proteins were found, of 630 kDa, 480 kDa, 390 kDa, 320 kDa, and the major constituent, 200kDa, that is present in both RF and cerebrospinal fluid, CSF. One of the most important RF-glycoproteins secreted by the SCO has been named SCO-spondin and is of major importance, especially during embryonic life.

Reissner’s fiber grows caudally by the addition of those glycoproteins at its cephalic end and extends along the brain aqueduct (Aqueduct of Sylvius), and the entire length of the central canal of the spinal cord, growing continuously in the caudal direction. It is just a small part of the secretions made by SCO and remains a matter of speculation, probably involved in many physiological functions, such as clearance of monoamines, detoxification of the CSF, neuronal surviving or the control of water balance.

The glycoproteins forming RF can be found in three conformations: the first is when the material aggregates over the SCO cilia, the so-called pre-RF; the second and most studied form is known as the proper RF, which is a cylindrical regular structure; and finally, a third and final form — massa caudalis — is known as the final distribution and the final assembly of the proteins.

=== Development ===
This fiber is essentially made by glycoproteins of high molecular mass, secreted by the subcommissural organ, which are released into the cerebrospinal fluid. Here, they aggregate on the top of the cilia, forming a thin film that becomes further packed in a highly ordered fashion to form a threadlike supramolecular structure.

The pre-RF material appears in the form of loosely arranged bundles of thin filaments. As a result, it is plausible that some biochemical modifications may occur to the pre-RF material in order for it to condensate and form the exact structure of Reissner’s fiber, such as disassembly and passage into neighboring vessels. Some of these changes may decrease the reactivity of the molecules, and this should be considered as a transitory stage, from pre- to the proper RF, in which the accessibility of the antibodies to the epitopes is decreased. This lack of immunoreactivity could be due to the spatial distribution of negatively charged sialic acid residues within the fiber, or might be the result of bound compounds interfering with the accessibility of the antibodies to RF- glycoproteins.

The massa caudalis is the final form of this assembly of proteins, and is mostly related to the distal side of accumulation of the fiber, and this final form has more filaments and is less compact than the middle form of the fiber.

The secretory material is first synthesised at embryonic day 3 (E3) by morphological undifferentiated neuroepithelial cells. At E7, post coitum, the SCO-spondin is released to embryonic CSF (ECSF); however, RF does not form until E11, and only at E12, the RF becomes present in the lumbar spinal cord. The mechanisms that trigger RF formation remain unknown, but probable factors other that ventricular release must be required for the formation of the fiber, such as the hydrodynamics of the CSF.

== Function ==
=== SCO-RF complex ===
This complex may participate in the maintenance of water and electrolyte homeostasis (osmoregulation), during ontogeny and in the composition of the cerebrospinal fluid.

The SCO-RF has been linked to various aspects of water and electrolyte metabolism, and it has been proven that water deprivation enhances the secretory activity of the SCO. This helps to support the correlation between this complex and the adrenal cortex, while the presence of receptors or binding sites for peptides involved in hydromineral balance — such as angiotensin II — has been reported in the SCO-RF. This complex is involved in many physiological functions, such as development of the spinal cord, the pathophysiology of lordosis and neuronal survival in a more developmental pathway.

=== RF and the cerebrospinal fluid ===
Due to the presence of sialic acid residues with negative charge, Reissner’s fiber might participate in the cleaning of the CSF. The glycoproteins bind biogenic amines present in the CSF such as dopamine, serotonin or noradrenaline, thereby controlling the concentration of these monoamines by ionic change. There are, however, differences in the binding characteristics of each of these amines; the binding of serotonin is more unstable, and it occurs only when its CSF concentration is high, while noradrenaline binds strongly to the RF and remains bound as it moves along the central canal in the same binding site as adrenaline.

The concentration of these monoamines in the CSF in Reissner’s fiber-deprived animals was investigated, concluding that this fiber possibly may be involved in the cleaning of the liquid — based upon elevated levels of CSF concentration of several amines displayed in the tested animals, with L-DOPA demonstrating the largest increase. All findings obtained indicate that RF binds monoamines present in the ventricular CSF and then transports them along the central canal. In the absence of RF, the CSF concentration of monoamines increased sharply.
