= Pandy's test =

- Purpose: detect the elevated levels of proteins

Pandy's test (or Pandy's reaction) is done on the CSF (cerebrospinal fluid) to detect the elevated levels of proteins (mainly globulins). This test is named after the Hungarian neurologist, Pándy Kálmán (1868–1945) who developed this test in the year 1910.

== Principle ==
Proteins (globulin and albumin) are precipitated by a saturated solution of phenol in water.

The reagent used is phenol (carbolic acid crystals dissolved in water) or, pyrogallic acid or, cresol, usually termed as Pandy's reagent or Pandy's solution.

== Procedure ==
One drop of CSF sample (collected from the patient by lumbar puncture technique), is added to about 1ml of Pandy's solution. The turbid appearance signifies the presence of elevated levels of globulin protein in the CSF and is regarded as positive Pandy's reaction. The CSF from a normal adult shows no turbidity or precipitates and this is a negative Pandy's reaction.

== Reactions and Results ==
Proteins in the cerebrospinal fluid, normally albumin and globulin are present in the ratio of 8 to 1. Increases in protein levels are of diagnostic value in neurological diseases.

The normal CSF is clear and transparent fluid. The Pandy's reaction makes it translucent or opaque.

=== Positive test ===
A positive test shows a bluish-white streak of precipitated proteins. The degree of turbidity depends on the amount of protein in the CSF. It can vary from faint turbidity (mild to moderate elevation in CSF proteins) to dense milky precipitate (high protein content in CSF).

The positive Pandy's reaction may indicate one or more of the following pathological conditions:

- Diabetes mellitus
- Brain tumor (Meningioma, Acoustic neuroma or, Ependymoma)
- Encapsulated brain abscess
- Spinal cord tumor
- Multiple sclerosis
- Acute purulent Meningitis
- Granulomatous Meningitis
- Carcinomatous Meningitis
- Syphilis (protein may be normal if longstanding)
- Guillain–Barré syndrome [Infectious polyneuritis] (Protein rises after 5–7 days)
- Cushing's disease
- Connective tissue disease
- Uremia
- Myxedema
- Cerebral hemorrhage

Normally, cerebrospinal fluid in adults contains about 15–45 mg/dL of protein, with albumin making up the bulk compared to globulins at roughly an 8:1 ratio. When Pandy’s reagent is added, a slight haze typically reflects protein levels between 50 and 100 mg/dL, whereas a thick, milk‑like cloud points to concentrations exceeding 100 mg/dL. Although this simple, low‑cost assay remains useful in laboratories with limited resources, it cannot distinguish individual protein types and may miss early Guillain‑Barré syndrome or chronic syphilis, so modern lab methods like electrophoresis or immunoassays are recommended for precise measurements.

=== Negative test ===
No cloudy turbidity observed. The CSF sample is normal i.e. with normal protein contents.

Please note that the normal CSF protein is also obtained in several pathological conditions like viral CNS infections, brainstem glioma, ischemic cerebrovascular accident.
