= Ernst Reissner =

Baltic German anatomist (1824–1878)

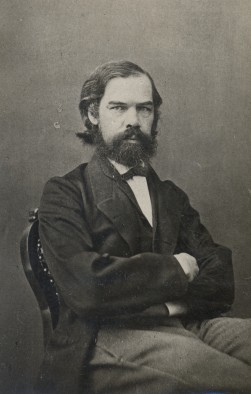
- Born: September 24, 1824
- Died: September 16, 1878 (aged 53)

Ernst Reissner (German: [ˈʁaɪsnɐ]; 24 September 1824 – 16 September 1878) was a Baltic German anatomist from Riga, Livonia.

In 1851 he received his medical degree at the Imperial University of Dorpat (now known as the University of Tartu), and in 1855 became a professor of anatomy at Dorpat. In 1875, he retired from teaching for health reasons.

Reissner is remembered for his anatomical studies of the ear, particularly research concerning the formation of the inner ear. By studying the embryos of birds and farm animals, he was able to determine individual stages involving the formation of the inner ears' labyrinth. From this research he was therefore able to conceptualize formation of the labyrinth in humans. Today, his name is lent to Reissner's membrane, a membrane inside the cochlea of the inner ear.

Another anatomical structure that is named after him is Reissner's fiber, a long, fibrous aggregation of glycoproteins secreted by the subcommissural organ in the third ventricle and extending through the central canal of the spinal cord.

== Sources ==
- Nsamba, Christian (1979). "Ernst Reissner 1824-1878". Archives of Otolaryngology. 105 (7): 434–435. doi:10.1001/archotol.1979.00790190060012. PMID 378206.
- Schacht, Jochen; Hawkins, Joseph E. (2004). "Sketches of Otohistory Part 4: A Cell by Any Other Name: Cochlear Eponyms" (PDF). Audiology and Neuro-Otology. 9 (6): 317–327. doi:10.1159/000081311. ISSN 1421-9700. PMID 15467285. Archived from the original (PDF) on 6 February 2012.
