= Hermann E. Reisner =

- Born: 1910; Berlin, Germany
- Died: 1991 (aged 80–81); Frankfurt am Main, Germany
- Occupation: Publishing
- Notable work: Reisners in America, Author

Hermann Eduard Reisner (1910 in Berlin – 2002 in Frankfurt am Main) was a German publisher and author of economic manuals, Guidebooks and Hardcover publications.

== Life and publishing activity ==
Reisner was born in Berlin in 1910, in 1929 he co-founded of the German export magazine "Übersee-Post". After World War II he moved from Berlin to Nuremberg and later to Frankfurt am Main, where he founded the "Made in Europe" publishing house (in 1954).

In the time of the German "Wirtschaftswunder" (the post-war "economic miracle"), Hermann E. Reisner became known as an editor and author of economic literature, magazines and practice-oriented export publications. In the early 1950s and 1960s he travelled to the US and published "business advises" for German entrepreneurs on trade issues, U.S. product, U.S. industry and how to deal with local authorities. His publications became major cross-cultural guidelines of international business for German entrepreneurs when dealing with trade partners around the globe.

== Publishing program (extract) ==
- 1929 overseas post office
- 1951 From Habana to La Paz by Pablo L. Harms
- 1950 My field is the world of Walter Winkler
- 1951 Testing Machines by H. Mintrop
- 1954 Made in Europe, various export magazines
- 1963 The writing and computing machine manufacture of Herbert Morgenbesser

== Author (extract) ==
- 1950 Dollar Drive
- 1952 Reisners in America
- 1964 Reisners in Africa
- 1965 Reisners in Australasia
- 1965 Reisner in V. R. China
- 1969 Reisners in South America

== Awards ==
Herman E. Reisner was recipient of the German Order of Merit.
