= Brain vesicle =

Brain precursor structures

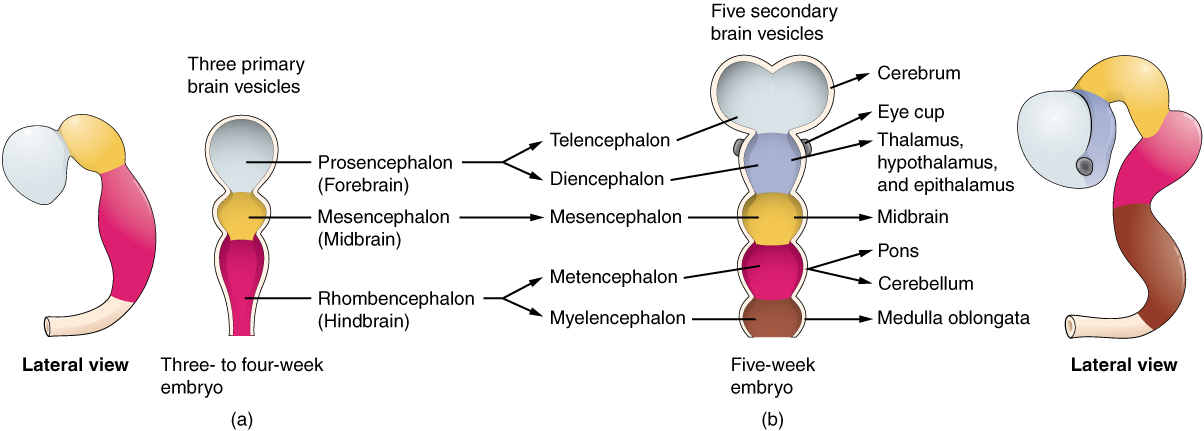
Lateral view of three-vesicle and five-vesicle stages of the early human embryo.

Brain vesicles are the bulge-like enlargements of the early development of the neural tube in vertebrates, which eventually give rise to the brain.

Vesicle formation begins shortly after the rostral closure of the neural tube, at about embryonic day 9.0 in mice, or the fourth and fifth gestational week in humans. In zebrafish and chicken embryos, brain vesicles form by about 24 hours and 48 hours post-conception, respectively.

Initially there are three primary brain vesicles: prosencephalon (i.e. forebrain), mesencephalon (i.e. midbrain) and rhombencephalon (i.e. hindbrain). These develop into five secondary brain vesicles – the prosencephalon is subdivided into the telencephalon and diencephalon, and the rhombencephalon into the metencephalon and myelencephalon. During these early vesicle stages, the walls of the neural tube contain neural stem cells in a region called the neuroepithelium or ventricular zone. These neural stem cells divide rapidly, driving growth of the early brain, but later, these stem cells begin to generate neurons through the process of neurogenesis.

== See also ==
- Cellular differentiation
- Radial glial cell
