= Metencephalon =

Part of the embryonic brain

- Diagram depicting the main subdivisions of the embryonic vertebrate brain. These regions will later differentiate into forebrain, midbrain and hindbrain structures.

- Pons and cerebellum.

Identifiers
- MeSH: D020540
- NeuroNames: 543
- NeuroLex ID: birnlex_965
- TA98: A14.1.03.004
- FMA: 62003

The metencephalon is the embryonic part of the hindbrain that differentiates into the pons and the cerebellum. It contains a portion of the fourth ventricle and the trigeminal nerve (CN V), abducens nerve (CN VI), facial nerve (CN VII), and a portion of the vestibulocochlear nerve (CN VIII).

== Embryology ==
The metencephalon develops from the higher/rostral half of the embryonic rhombencephalon, and is differentiated from the myelencephalon in the embryo by approximately 5 weeks of age. By the third month, the metencephalon differentiates into its two main structures, the pons and the cerebellum.

== Functions ==
The pons regulates breathing through particular nuclei that regulate the breathing center of the medulla oblongata. The cerebellum works to coordinate muscle movements, maintain posture, and integrate sensory information from the inner ear and proprioceptors in the muscles and joints.

== Development ==
At the early stages of brain development, the brain vesicles that are formed are imperative. Each brain region is characterized by its own specific architecture. These regions of the brain are determined by a combination of transcription factors and the signals that change their expression.

The isthmus is the main organizing center for the tectum and the cerebellum. The tectum is the dorsal part of the metencephalon. The tectum includes the superior and inferior colliculli, which play a part in visual and audio processing. Two of the major genes that affect the metencephalon are Fgf8 and Wnt1, which are both expressed around the isthmus. Fgf8 is also known as Fibroblast Growth Factor 8. It is a protein that is widely thought to be the most important organizing signal. Its main function is to set up and maintain the barrier between the midbrain and hindbrain, specifically between the mesencephalon and metencephalon. It also plays a large role in deciding the structure of the mid- and hindbrain. Wnt1 is a proto-oncogene protein (Wingless-type MMTV integration site family, member 1). This gene was originally thought to play a role in the development of the midbrain and hindbrain, but studies have shown that this may not be the case. Wnt1 is thought to be behind the genetic disorder called Joubert Syndrome, a disorder that affects the cerebellum.

Otx1 and Otx2 are genes that play important parts in the development of the brain, and studies have shown that their roles change throughout the brain’s development. It is thought that at the stage of brain development wherein the rostral brain is regionalized into its different parts (telencephalon, diencephalon, metencephalon, and mesencephalon) that Otx2 and Otx1 protect the caudalization of the diencephalon and mesencephalon into metencephalon.

Cross-section of the middle pons (at the level of cranial nerve V).

Cross-section of the inferior pons (at the level of the facial genu).

== See also ==
- Mesencephalon
- Telencephalon
- Myelencephalon
- List of regions in the human brain
