= Hindbrain =

Part of the embryonic brain

- Diagram depicting the main subdivisions of the embryonic vertebrate brain. These regions will later differentiate into forebrain, midbrain and hindbrain structures.

- Scheme of the roof of the fourth ventricle.

Identifiers
- MeSH: D012249
- NeuroNames: 540
- NeuroLex ID: birnlex_942
- TA98: A14.1.03.002
- FMA: 67687

The hindbrain, rhombencephalon (shaped like a rhombus) is a developmental categorization of portions of the central nervous system in vertebrates. It includes the medulla, pons, and cerebellum. Together they support vital bodily processes.

== Metencephalon ==
Rhombomeres Rh3-Rh1 form the metencephalon.

The metencephalon is composed of the pons and the cerebellum; it contains:

- a portion of the fourth (IV) ventricle,
- the trigeminal nerve (CN V),
- abducens nerve (CN VI),
- facial nerve (CN VII),
- and a portion of the vestibulocochlear nerve (CN VIII).

== Myelencephalon ==
Rhombomeres Rh8-Rh4 form the myelencephalon.

The myelencephalon forms the medulla oblongata in the adult brain; it contains:

- a portion of the fourth ventricle,
- the glossopharyngeal nerve (CN IX),
- vagus nerve (CN X),
- accessory nerve (CN XI),
- hypoglossal nerve (CN XII),
- and a portion of the vestibulocochlear nerve (CN VIII).

== Evolution ==
The hindbrain is homologous to a part of the arthropod brain known as the sub-oesophageal ganglion, in terms of the genes that it expresses and its position in between the brain and the nerve cord. It has been suggested that the hindbrain first evolved in the urbilaterian—the last common ancestor of chordates and arthropods—between 570 and 555 million years ago.

== Hindbrain diseases ==
A rare brain disease of the cerebellum is rhombencephalosynapsis characterized by an absent or partially formed vermis. Symptoms can include truncal ataxia. The disorder is a main feature of Gomez-Lopez-Hernandez syndrome.
