= Myelencephalon =

Posterior region of the embryonic hindbrain

Myelencephalon Afterbrain
- Diagram depicting the main subdivisions of the embryonic vertebrate brain. These regions will later differentiate into forebrain, midbrain and hindbrain structures

Details

Identifiers
- Latin: myelencephalon
- MeSH: D054024
- NeuroNames: 698
- TA98: A14.1.03.003
- TA2: 5983

The myelencephalon or afterbrain is the most posterior region of the embryonic hindbrain, from which the medulla oblongata develops.

Myelencephalon is from myel- (bone marrow or spinal cord) and encephalon (the vertebrate brain).

== Development ==
=== Neural tube to myelencephalon ===
During fetal development, divisions of the neural tube that give rise to the hindbrain (rhombencephalon) and the other primary vesicles (forebrain and midbrain) occur 28 days after conception. With the exception of the midbrain, these primary vesicles undergo further differentiation at 5 weeks after conception to form the myelencephalon and the other secondary vesicles.

=== Myelencephalon to medulla ===
The final shape differentiation of the myelencephalon into the medulla oblongata can be observed at 20 weeks of gestation.

Neural Tube	Primary Vesicles	Secondary Vesicles	Adult Structures
Brain	Forebrain	Telencephalon	Rhinencephalon, Amygdala, Hippocampus, Cerebrum(Cortex), Basal Ganglia, Lateral ventricles
Brain	Forebrain	Diencephalon	Epithalamus, Thalamus, Hypothalamus, Subthalamus, Pituitary, Pineal, Third ventricle
Brain	Midbrain	Mesencephalon	Tectum, Cerebral peduncle, Pretectum, Cerebral aqueduct
Brain	Hindbrain	Metencephalon	Pons, Cerebellum
Brain	Hindbrain	Myelencephalon	Medulla Oblongata
Spinal cord

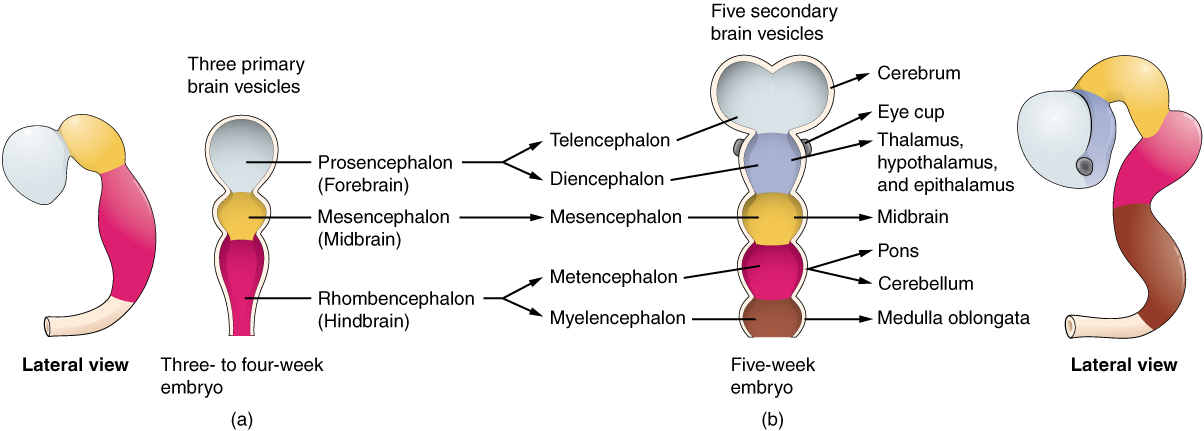
Primary and secondary vesicle stages of development

== Medulla oblongata ==
The medulla oblongata is part of the brain stem that serves as the connection of the spinal cord to the brain. It is situated between the pons and the spinal cord.

Medulla oblongata- animation

=== Function ===
The medulla oblongata is responsible for several functions of the autonomic nervous system. These functions include:

1) Respiration: monitors the acidity of the blood and sends electrical signals to intercostal muscle tissue to increase their contraction rate in order to oxygenate the blood as needed.

2) Cardiac & Vasomotor Center: monitors and regulates cardiovascular activities by:

- Sympathetic excitation in order to increase cardiac output
- Parasympathetic inhibition of cardiac output
- Affecting blood pressure via vasodilation and vasoconstriction

3) Reflexes

- Coughing
- Sneezing
- Swallowing (palatal)
- Vomiting
- Gagging (pharyngeal)
- Jaw jerk (masseter)

=== Damage/trauma ===
Because of its location in the brainstem and its many important roles in the autonomic nervous system, damage to the medulla oblongata is usually fatal.
