= Hegemonikon =

Ruling faculty of the soul in Greek philosophy of mind

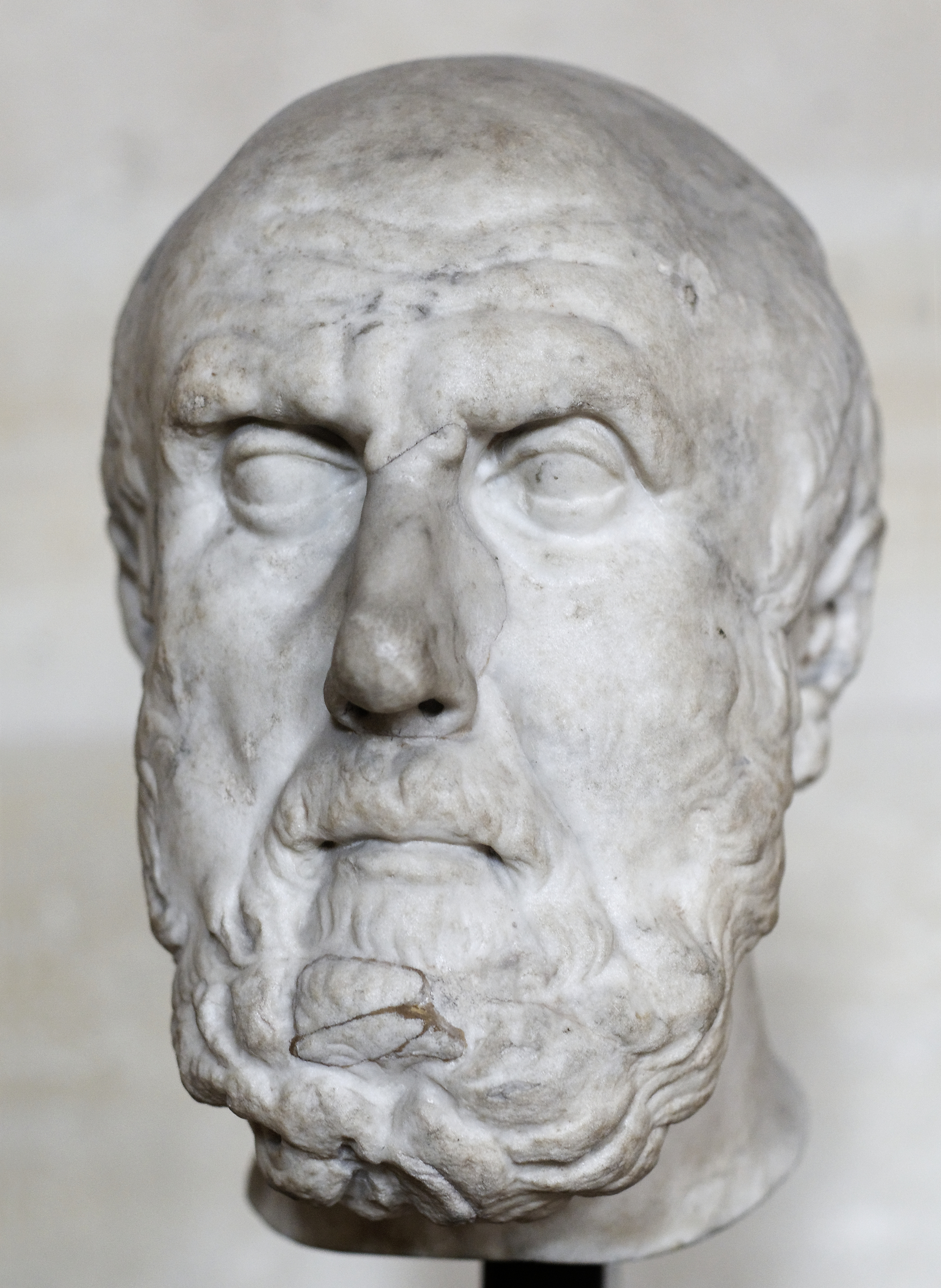
Roman marble portrait of Chrysippus of Soli (Louvre Ma 326), the Stoic philosopher whose systematic account of the hegemonikon is the best-known ancient treatment of the concept.

The hegemonikon (Ancient Greek: ἡγεμονικόν, romanized: hēgemonikón, "ruling part") is a term in ancient Greek philosophy of mind for the soul's governing or commanding faculty, the part responsible for sensation, judgment, impulse and assent. Although the word had earlier use, the doctrine was most fully developed by the Stoics of the third century BCE, who held that the rational soul is a single, unified hegemonikon located in the heart and identified with the highest grade of pneuma. Because almost nothing of Chrysippus's own writing on the soul survives, the doctrine is known chiefly through the polemical commentary of the second-century physician Galen in De placitis Hippocratis et Platonis, which attacks the Stoic account from a cephalocentric and Platonic standpoint. The concept remained central to later Roman Stoicism, particularly in Epictetus and Marcus Aurelius, and is a standard topic in modern scholarship on Hellenistic philosophy and the history of neuropsychology.

== Etymology ==
The word is the neuter of the adjective ἡγεμονικός (hēgemonikós, "fit to lead"), derived from ἡγεμών (hēgemōn, "leader", "ruler"), substantivized with the definite article as τὸ ἡγεμονικόν ("the ruling part"). In Latin Stoic sources the term is rendered principale or principatus (Cicero, Seneca).

== Pre-Stoic usage ==
Before the Stoics, ancient writers spoke of a governing part of the soul without using hegemonikon as a fixed technical term. The physician Alcmaeon of Croton, in the early fifth century BCE, identified the brain as the seat of the ruling faculty, an early statement of the cephalocentric position. Plato's Timaeus assigns the rational soul a hierarchical primacy in the head, while in the Republic he divides the soul into three parts (rational, spirited, appetitive), only one of which rules. Aristotle treated the soul as a hierarchy of faculties without using hegemonikon as a name for the highest among them.

== Stoic doctrine ==
For the early Stoics—Zeno of Citium, Cleanthes and especially Chrysippus—the soul is corporeal, made of pneuma (warm breath), and consists of eight parts: the five senses, the faculties of voice and reproduction, and a central hegemonikon. The peripheral parts are extensions of the hegemonikon, which the Stoics likened to an octopus whose tentacles reach out from a single centre. Unlike Plato's tripartite soul, the Stoic soul is monistic and fully rational in the adult human: all impulses (hormai) and emotions (pathē) are functions of the same commanding faculty.

The hegemonikon performs four basic activities: receiving impressions (phantasiai), giving or withholding assent (sunkatathesis), generating impulse, and exercising reason (logos). Of these, assent is the locus of moral responsibility: virtue and vice are constituted by the assents one gives. In the second century BCE, Posidonius partly modified the orthodox account by allowing for non-rational "emotional movements" within the hegemonikon, a position preserved—and disputed—in Galen's report.

== Location ==
The Stoics placed the hegemonikon in the heart, following the cardiocentric hypothesis developed by Aristotle and the physician Praxagoras of Cos. Stoic embryology pointed to the same conclusion: because the heart is the first organ to form in the foetus, the Stoics held that the pneuma of the soul originates there and extends through the body. This placement was central to the centuries-long dispute with proponents of the cephalocentric hypothesis who located the ruling faculty in the brain.

== Galen's critique ==
Most of what is known about the Stoic hegemonikon survives only because Galen (c. 129 – c. 216 CE) chose to attack it. His De placitis Hippocratis et Platonis devotes its fourth and fifth books to refuting Chrysippus, quoting the latter's lost treatise On Passions at length in the process. Galen argued, on anatomical grounds and in defence of a Platonic tripartite soul located in the brain, that the Stoic identification of a single cardiac hegemonikon was both empirically wrong and explanatorily inadequate, especially for accounting for the conflict between reason and emotion. The paradox—that the most extensive source for Stoic psychology is its most hostile reader—shapes all modern reconstruction of the doctrine.

== Roman Stoicism ==
In the Roman Stoa the term retained its technical sense but acquired a stronger ethical and self-directive use. Epictetus treats the hegemonikon as the locus of prohairesis ("moral choice"), the faculty through which the agent assents to or rejects impressions and is therefore alone "in our power". Marcus Aurelius, writing in Greek in his Meditations, repeatedly addresses τὸ ἡγεμονικόν as the part of himself to be guarded and trained—his "inner ruler" or "governing self".

== Modern scholarship ==
The reconstruction of Stoic psychology, including the hegemonikon, was placed on a systematic textual footing by Anthony A. Long and David Sedley in The Hellenistic Philosophers (1987), which collects and translates the relevant fragments by topic. Brad Inwood (1985) developed the role of the hegemonikon in Stoic action theory, and Richard Sorabji (2006) drew on the term in tracing ancient ideas of selfhood. The concept is also widely discussed in the historiography of early neuroscience as the focal term of the cephalocentric/cardiocentric debate.

== See also ==
- Prohairesis
- Kathekon
- Apatheia
- Pneuma (Stoic)
- Stoic passions
- Cardiocentric hypothesis
- On Passions
