= History of neuroscience =

From the ancient Egyptian mummifications to 18th-century scientific research on "globules" and neurons, there is evidence of neuroscience practice throughout the early periods of history. The early civilizations lacked adequate means to obtain knowledge about the human brain. Their assumptions about the inner workings of the mind, therefore, were not accurate. Early views on the function of the brain regarded it to be a form of "cranial stuffing" of sorts. In ancient Egypt, from the late Middle Kingdom onwards, in preparation for mummification, the brain was regularly removed, for it was the heart that was assumed to be the seat of intelligence. According to Herodotus, during the first step of mummification: "The most perfect practice is to extract as much of the brain as possible with an iron hook, and what the hook cannot reach is mixed with drugs." Over the next five thousand years, this view came to be reversed; the brain is now known to be the seat of intelligence, although colloquial variations of the former remain as in "memorizing something by heart".

== Antiquity ==
Hieroglyph designating the brain or skull in the Edwin Smith papyrus

The earliest reference to the brain occurs in the Edwin Smith Surgical Papyrus, written in the 17th century BC. The hieroglyph for brain, occurring eight times in this papyrus, describes the symptoms, diagnosis, and prognosis of two patients, wounded in the head, who had compound fractures of the skull. The assessments of the author (a battlefield surgeon) of the papyrus allude to ancient Egyptians having a vague recognition of the effects of head trauma. While the symptoms are well written and detailed, the absence of a medical precedent is apparent. The author of the passage notes "the pulsations of the exposed brain" and compared the surface of the brain to the rippling surface of copper slag (which indeed has a gyral-sulcal pattern). The laterality of injury was related to the laterality of symptom, and both aphasia ("he speaks not to thee") and seizures ("he shudders exceedingly") after head injury were described. Observations by ancient civilizations of the human brain suggest only a relative understanding of the basic mechanics and the importance of cranial security. Furthermore, considering the general consensus of medical practice pertaining to human anatomy was based on myths and superstition, the thoughts of the battlefield surgeon appear to be empirical and based on logical deduction and simple observation.

In Ancient Greece, interest in the brain began with the work of Alcmaeon, who appeared to have dissected the eye and related the brain to vision. He also suggested that the brain, not the heart, was the organ that ruled the body (what Stoics would call the hegemonikon) and that the senses were dependent on the brain. According to ancient authorities, Alcmaeon believed the power of the brain to synthesize sensations made it also the seat of memories and thought. The author of On the Sacred Disease, part of the Hippocratic corpus, likewise believed the brain to be the seat of intelligence.

The debate regarding the hegemonikon persisted among ancient Greek philosophers and physicians for a very long time. Already in the 4th century BC, Aristotle thought that the heart was the seat of intelligence, while the brain was a cooling mechanism for the blood. He reasoned that humans are more rational than the beasts because, among other reasons, they have a larger brain to cool their hot-bloodedness. On the opposite end, during the Hellenistic period, Herophilus and Erasistratus of Alexandria engaged in studies that involved dissecting human bodies, providing evidence for the primacy of the brain. They affirmed the distinction between the cerebrum and the cerebellum, and identified the ventricles and the dura mater. Their works are now mostly lost, and we know about their achievements due mostly to secondary sources. Some of their discoveries had to be re-discovered a millennium after their death.

During the Roman Empire, the Greek physician and philosopher Galen dissected the brains of oxen, Barbary apes, swine, and other non-human mammals. He concluded that, as the cerebellum was denser than the brain, it must control the muscles, while as the cerebrum was soft, it must be where the senses were processed. Galen further theorized that the brain functioned by the movement of animal spirits through the ventricles. He also noted that specific spinal nerves controlled specific muscles, and had the idea of the reciprocal action of muscles. Only in the 19th century, in the work of François Magendie and Charles Bell, would the understanding of spinal function surpass that of Galen.

== Medieval to early modern ==
Islamic medicine in the middle ages was focused on how the mind and body interacted and emphasized a need to understand mental health. Circa 1000, Al-Zahrawi, living in Islamic Iberia, evaluated neurological patients and performed surgical treatments of head injuries, skull fractures, spinal injuries, hydrocephalus, subdural effusions and headache. In Persia, Avicenna (Ibn-Sina) presented detailed knowledge about skull fractures and their surgical treatments. Avicenna is regarded by some as the father of modern medicine. He wrote 40 pieces on medicine with the most notable being the Qanun, a medical encyclopedia that would become a staple at universities for nearly a hundred years. He also explained phenomena such as, insomnia, mania, hallucinations, nightmares, dementia, epilepsy, stroke, paralysis, vertigo, melancholia and tremors. He also described a condition similar to schizophrenia, which he called Junun Mufrit, characterized by agitation, behavioral and sleep disturbances, giving inappropriate answers to questions, and occasional inability to speak. Avicenna also discovered the cerebellar vermis, which he simply called the vermis, and the caudate nucleus. Both terms are still used in neuroanatomy today. He was also the first person to associate mental deficits with deficits in the brain's middle ventricle or frontal lobe. Abulcasis, Averroes, Avenzoar, and Maimonides, active in the Medieval Muslim world, also described a number of medical problems related to the brain.

Between the 13th and 14th centuries, the first anatomy textbooks in Europe, which included a description of the brain, were written by Mondino de Luzzi and Guido da Vigevano.

=== Renaissance ===
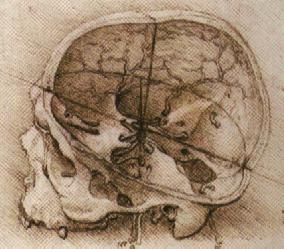
One of Leonardo da Vinci's sketches of the human skull

Work by Andreas Vesalius on human cadavers found problems with the Galenic view of anatomy. Vesalius noted many structural characteristics of both the brain and general nervous system during his dissections. In addition to recording many anatomical features such as the putamen and corpus callosum, Vesalius proposed that the brain was made up of seven pairs of 'brain nerves', each with a specialized function. Other scholars furthered Vesalius' work by adding their own detailed sketches of the human brain.

=== Scientific Revolution ===
In the 17th century, René Descartes studied the physiology of the brain, proposing the theory of dualism to tackle the issue of the brain's relation to the mind. He suggested that the pineal gland was where the mind interacted with the body after recording the brain mechanisms responsible for circulating cerebrospinal fluid. Jan Swammerdam placed severed frog thigh muscle in an airtight syringe with a small amount of water in the tip and when he caused the muscle to contract by irritating the nerve, the water level did not rise but rather was lowered by a minute amount debunking balloonist theory. The idea that nerve stimulation led to movement had important implications by putting forward the idea that behaviour is based on stimuli. Thomas Willis studied the brain, nerves, and behavior to develop neurologic treatments. He described in great detail the structure of the brainstem, the cerebellum, the ventricles, and the cerebral hemispheres.

== Modern period ==
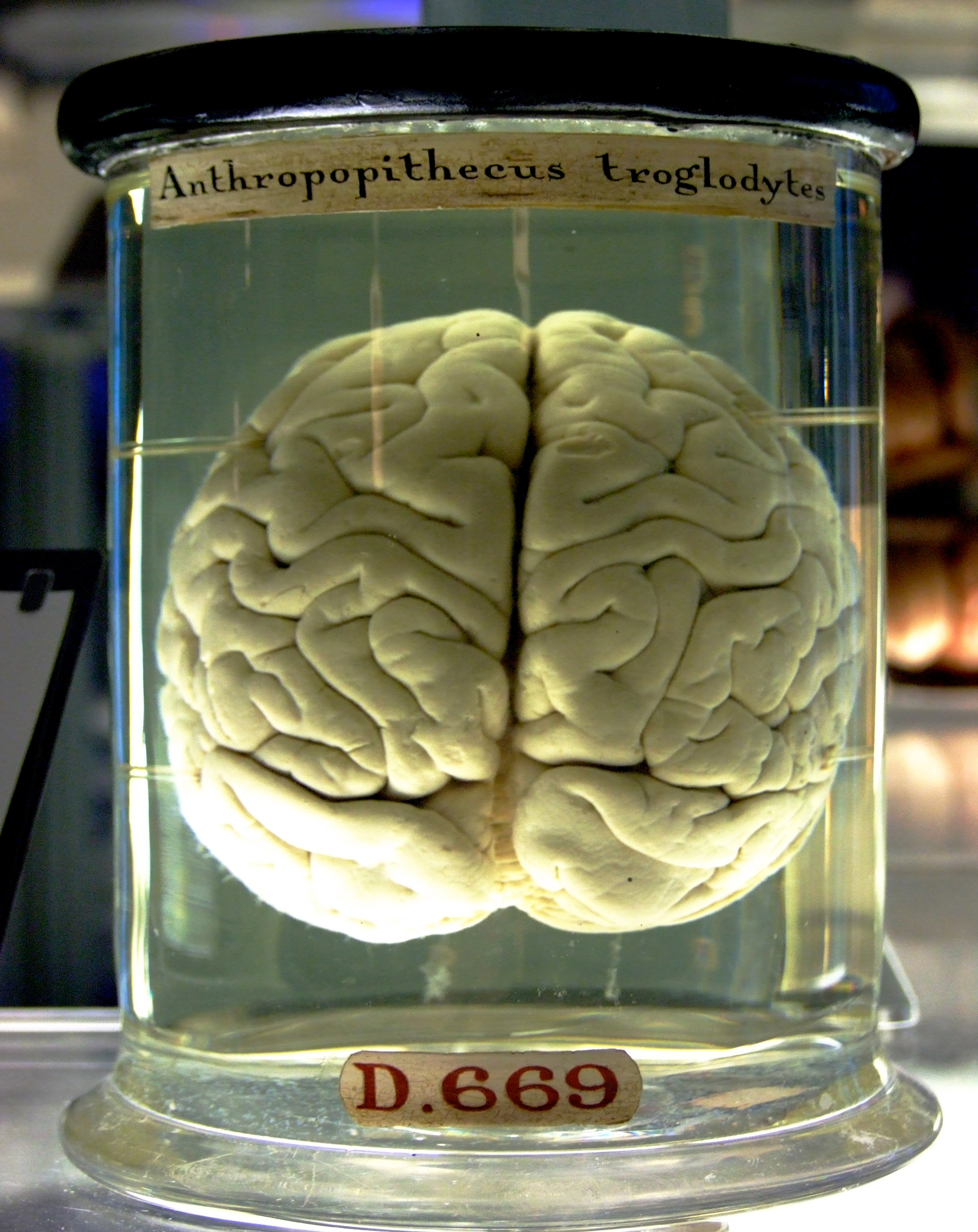
Brain of a chimp preserved at Science Museum, London

The role of electricity in nerves was first observed in dissected frogs by Luigi Galvani, Lucia Galeazzi Galvani and Giovanni Aldini in the second half of the 18th century. In 1811, César Julien Jean Legallois defined a specific function of a brain region for the first time. He studied respiration in animal dissection and lesions, and found the center of respiration in the medulla oblongata. Between 1811 and 1824, Charles Bell and François Magendie discovered through dissection and vivisection that the ventral roots in spine transmit motor impulses and the posterior roots receive sensory input (Bell–Magendie law). In the 1820s, Jean Pierre Flourens pioneered the experimental method of carrying out localized lesions of the brain in animals describing their effects on motricity, sensibility and behavior. He concluded that the ablation of the cerebellum resulted in movements that "were not regular and coordinated". In 1843, Carlo Matteucci and Emil du Bois-Reymond demonstrated that nerve fibers transmitted electrical signals. Hermann von Helmholtz measured these to travel at a rate between 24 and 38 meters per second in 1850.

In 1848, John Martyn Harlow described that Phineas Gage had his frontal lobe pierced by an iron tamping rod in a blasting accident. He became a case study in the connection between the prefrontal cortex and executive functions. In 1861, Paul Broca heard of a patient at the Bicêtre Hospital who had a 21-year progressive loss of speech and paralysis but neither a loss of comprehension nor mental function. Broca performed an autopsy and determined that the patient had a lesion in the frontal lobe in the left cerebral hemisphere. Broca published his findings from the autopsies of twelve patients in 1865. His work inspired others to perform careful autopsies with the aim of linking more brain regions to sensory and motor functions. Another French neurologist, Marc Dax, made similar observations a generation earlier. Broca's hypothesis was supported by Gustav Fritsch and Eduard Hitzig who discovered in 1870 that electrical stimulation of motor cortex caused involuntary muscular contractions of specific parts of a dog's body and by observations of epileptic patients conducted by John Hughlings Jackson, who correctly deduced in the 1870s the organization of the motor cortex by watching the progression of seizures through the body. Carl Wernicke further developed the theory of the specialization of specific brain structures in language comprehension and production. Richard Caton presented his findings in 1875 about electrical phenomena of the cerebral hemispheres of rabbits and monkeys. In 1878, Hermann Munk found in dogs and monkeys that vision was localized in the occipital cortical area, David Ferrier found in 1881 that audition was localized in the superior temporal gyrus and Harvey Cushing found in 1909 that the sense of touch was localized in the postcentral gyrus. Modern research still uses the Korbinian Brodmann's cytoarchitectonic (referring to study of cell structure) anatomical definitions from this era in continuing to show that distinct areas of the cortex are activated in the execution of specific tasks.

Studies of the brain became more sophisticated after the invention of the microscope and the development of a staining procedure by Camillo Golgi during the late 1890s that used a silver chromate salt to reveal the intricate structures of single neurons. His technique was used by Santiago Ramón y Cajal and led to the formation of the neuron doctrine, the hypothesis that the functional unit of the brain is the neuron. Golgi and Ramón y Cajal shared the Nobel Prize in Physiology or Medicine in 1906 for their extensive observations, descriptions and categorizations of neurons throughout the brain. The hypotheses of the neuron doctrine were supported by experiments following Galvani's pioneering work in the electrical excitability of muscles and neurons. In 1898, British scientist John Newport Langley first coined the term "autonomic" in classifying the connections of nerve fibers to peripheral nerve cells. Langley is known as one of the fathers of the chemical receptor theory, and as the origin of the concept of "receptive substance". Towards the end of the nineteenth century Francis Gotch conducted several experiments on nervous system function. In 1899 he described the "inexcitable" or "refractory phase" that takes place between nerve impulses. His primary focus was on how nerve interaction affected the muscles and eyes.

Heinrich Obersteiner in 1887 founded the Institute for Anatomy and Physiology of the CNS, later called Neurological or Obersteiner Institute of the Vienna University School of Medicine. It was one of the first brain research institutions in the world. He studied the cerebellar cortex, described the Redlich–Obersteiner's zone and wrote one of the first books on neuroanatomy in 1888. Róbert Bárány, who worked on the physiology and pathology of the vestibular apparatus, attended this school, graduating in 1900. Obersteiner was later superseded by Otto Marburg.

== Twentieth century ==
Neuroscience during the twentieth century began to be recognized as a distinct unified academic discipline, rather than studies of the nervous system being a factor of science belonging to a variety of disciplines.

Ivan Pavlov contributed to many areas of neurophysiology. Most of his work involved research in temperament, conditioning and involuntary reflex actions. In 1891, Pavlov was invited to the Institute of Experimental Medicine in St. Petersburg to organize and direct the Department of Physiology. He published The Work of the Digestive Glands in 1897, after 12 years of research. His experiments earned him the 1904 Nobel Prize in Physiology and Medicine. During the same period, Vladimir Bekhterev discovered 15 new reflexes and is known for his competition with Pavlov regarding the study of conditioned reflexes. He founded the Psychoneurological Institute at the St. Petersburg State Medical Academy in 1907 where he worked with Alexandre Dogiel. In the institute, he attempted to establish a multidisciplinary approach to brain exploration. The Institute of Higher Nervous Activity in Moscow, Russia was established on July 14, 1950.

Charles Scott Sherrington's work focused strongly on reflexes and his experiments led up to the discovery of motor units. His concepts centered around unitary behaviour of cells activated or inhibited at what he called synapses. Sherrington received the Nobel prize for showing that reflexes require integrated activation and demonstrated reciprocal innervation of muscles (Sherrington's law). Sherrington also worked with Thomas Graham Brown who developed one of the first ideas about central pattern generators in 1911. Brown recognized that the basic pattern of stepping can be produced by the spinal cord without the need of descending commands from the cortex.

Acetylcholine was the first neurotransmitter to be identified. It was first identified in 1915 by Henry Hallett Dale for its actions on heart tissue. It was confirmed as a neurotransmitter in 1921 by Otto Loewi in Graz. Loewi demonstrated the ″humorale Übertragbarkeit der Herznervenwirkung″ first in amphibians. He initially gave it the name Vagusstoff because it was released from the vagus nerve and in 1936 he wrote: "I no longer hesitate to identify the Sympathicusstoff with adrenaline."

A graph showing the threshold for nervous system response

One major question for neuroscientists in the early twentieth century was the physiology of nerve impulses. In 1902 and again in 1912, Julius Bernstein advanced the hypothesis that the action potential resulted from a change in the permeability of the axonal membrane to ions. Bernstein was also the first to introduce the Nernst equation for resting potential across the membrane. In 1907, Louis Lapicque suggested that the action potential was generated as a threshold was crossed, what would be later shown as a product of the dynamical systems of ionic conductances. A great deal of study on sensory organs and the function of nerve cells was conducted by British physiologist Keith Lucas and his protege Edgar Adrian. Keith Lucas' experiments in the first decade of the twentieth century proved that muscles contract entirely or not at all, this was referred to as the all-or-none principle. Edgar Adrian observed nerve fibers in action during his experiments on frogs. This proved that scientists could study nervous system function directly, not just indirectly. This led to a rapid increase in the variety of experiments conducted in the field of neurophysiology and innovation in the technology necessary for these experiments. Much of Adrian's early research was inspired by studying the way vacuum tubes intercepted and enhanced coded messages. Concurrently, Joseph Erlanger and Herbert Gasser were able to modify an oscilloscope to run at low voltages and were able to observe that action potentials occurred in two phases—a spike followed by an after-spike. They discovered that nerves were found in many forms, each with their own potential for excitability. With this research, the pair discovered that the velocity of action potentials was directly proportional to the diameter of the nerve fiber and received a Nobel Prize for their work.

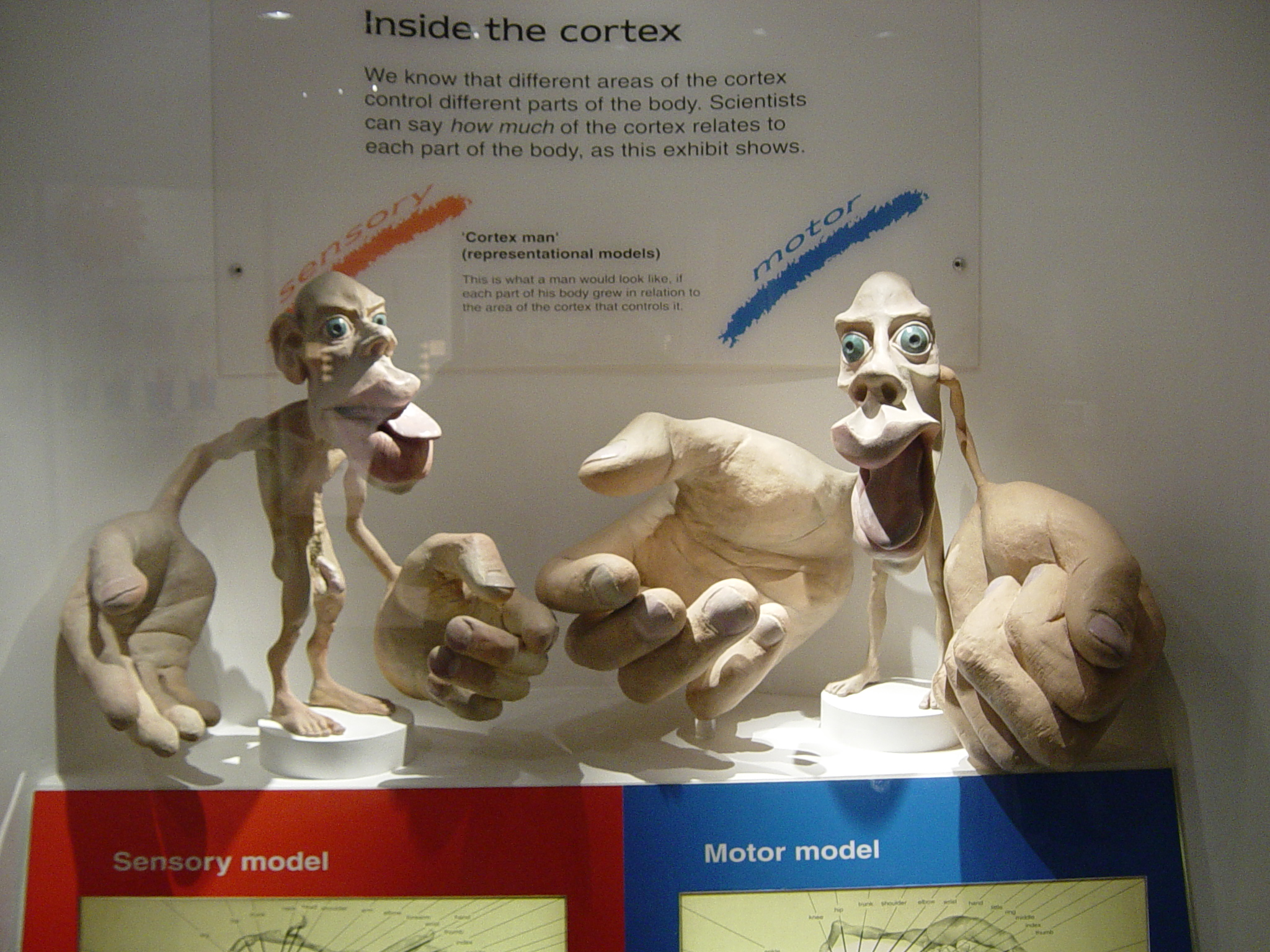
3-D sensory and motor homunculus models at the Natural History Museum, London

In the process of treating epilepsy, Wilder Penfield produced maps of the location of various functions (motor, sensory, memory, vision) in the brain. He summarized his findings in a 1950 book called The Cerebral Cortex of Man. Wilder Penfield and his co-investigators Edwin Boldrey and Theodore Rasmussen are considered to be the originators of the cortical homunculus.

Kenneth Cole joined Columbia University in 1937 and remained there until 1946 where he made pioneering advances modelling the electrical properties of nervous tissue. Bernstein's hypothesis about the action potential was confirmed by Cole and Howard Curtis, who showed that membrane conductance increases during an action potential. David E. Goldman worked with Cole and derived the Goldman equation in 1943 at Columbia University. Alan Lloyd Hodgkin spent a year (1937–38) at the Rockefeller Institute, during which he joined Cole to measure the D.C. resistance of the membrane of the squid giant axon in the resting state. In 1939 they began using internal electrodes inside the giant nerve fibre of the squid and Cole developed the voltage clamp technique in 1947. Hodgkin and Andrew Huxley later presented a mathematical model for transmission of electrical signals in neurons of the giant axon of a squid and how they are initiated and propagated, known as the Hodgkin–Huxley model. In 1961–1962, Richard FitzHugh and J. Nagumo simplified Hodgkin–Huxley, in what is called the FitzHugh–Nagumo model. In 1962, Bernard Katz modeled neurotransmission across the space between neurons known as synapses. Beginning in 1966, Eric Kandel and collaborators examined biochemical changes in neurons associated with learning and memory storage in Aplysia. In 1981 Catherine Morris and Harold Lecar combined these models in the Morris–Lecar model. Such increasingly quantitative work gave rise to numerous biological neuron models and models of neural computation.

Eric Kandel and collaborators have cited David Rioch, Francis O. Schmitt, and Stephen Kuffler as having played critical roles in establishing the field. Rioch originated the integration of basic anatomical and physiological research with clinical psychiatry at the Walter Reed Army Institute of Research, starting in the 1950s. During the same period, Schmitt established a neuroscience research program within the Biology Department at the Massachusetts Institute of Technology, bringing together biology, chemistry, physics, and mathematics. The first freestanding neuroscience department (then called Psychobiology) was founded in 1964 at the University of California, Irvine by James L. McGaugh. Stephen Kuffler started the Department of Neurobiology at Harvard Medical School in 1966. The first official use of the word "Neuroscience" may be in 1962 with Francis O. Schmitt's "Neuroscience Research Program", which was hosted by the Massachusetts Institute of Technology.

Over time, brain research has gone through philosophical, experimental, and theoretical phases, with work on brain simulation predicted to be important in the future.

== Institutes and organizations ==
As a result of the increasing interest about the nervous system, several prominent neuroscience institutes and organizations have been formed to provide a forum to all neuroscientists. The largest professional neuroscience organization is the Society for Neuroscience (SFN), which is based in the United States but includes many members from other countries.

List of the major institutes and organizations
| Foundation | Institute or organization |
|---|---|
| 1887 | Obersteiner Institute of the Vienna University School of Medicine |
| 1903 | The brain commission of the International Association of Academies |
| 1907 | Psychoneurological Institute at the St. Petersburg State Medical Academy |
| 1909 | Netherlands Central Institute for Brain Research in Amsterdam, now Netherlands Institute for Neuroscience |
| 1947 | National Institute of Mental Health and Neurosciences |
| 1950 | Institute of Higher Nervous Activity |
| 1960 | International Brain Research Organization |
| 1963 | International Society for Neurochemistry |
| 1968 | European Brain and Behaviour Society |
| 1968 | British Neuroscience Association |
| 1969 | Society for Neuroscience |
| 1997 | National Brain Research Centre |

In 2013, the BRAIN Initiative was announced in the US. An International Brain Initiative was created in 2017, currently integrated by more than seven national-level brain research initiatives (US, Europe, Allen Institute, Japan, China, Australia, Canada, Korea, Israel) spanning four continents.

== See also ==
- History of catecholamine research
- History of neuraxial anesthesia
- History of neurology and neurosurgery
- History of psychiatry
- History of psychology
- History of neuropsychology
- History of neurophysiology
- History of science
- List of neurologists
- List of neuroscientists
- Cephalocentric hypothesis
