= On Passions =

Work by Greek Stoic philosopher Chrysippus

- Author: Chrysippus
- Original title: Περὶ παθῶν
- Language: Ancient Greek
- Subject: Ethics
- Genre: Philosophy
- Publication date: c. 225 BCE
- Publication place: Ancient Greece

On Passions (Greek: Περὶ παθῶν; Peri pathōn), also translated as On Emotions or On Affections, is a work by the Greek Stoic philosopher Chrysippus dating from the 3rd-century BCE. The book has not survived intact, but around seventy fragments from the work survive in a polemic written against it in the 2nd-century CE by the philosopher-physician Galen. In addition Cicero summarises substantial portions of the work in his 1st-century BCE work Tusculan Disputations. On Passions consisted of four books; of which the first three discussed the Stoic theory of emotions and the fourth book discussed therapy and had a separate title—Therapeutics. Most surviving quotations come from Books 1 and 4, although Galen also provides an account of Book 2 drawn from the 1st-century BCE Stoic philosopher Posidonius. Little or nothing is known about Book 3.

The Stoics believed that the mind was rational, and that emotions involve judgements. The Stoic passions are emotions such as fear, anger, and desire which cause suffering. In his On Passions, Chrysippus explained how the passions arise from the mistaken opinions of what is good and bad. They are excessive and disobedient to reason, which Chrysippus compared to a runner who is out-of-control. A person in the grip of passion has rejected reason, and therapy is a medical art needed to treat the mind. The treatment outlined by Chrysippus was mostly preventative, demonstrating by theory that the passions are neither natural or necessary, and showing through practice that the mind can be trained to reject them.

== Background ==
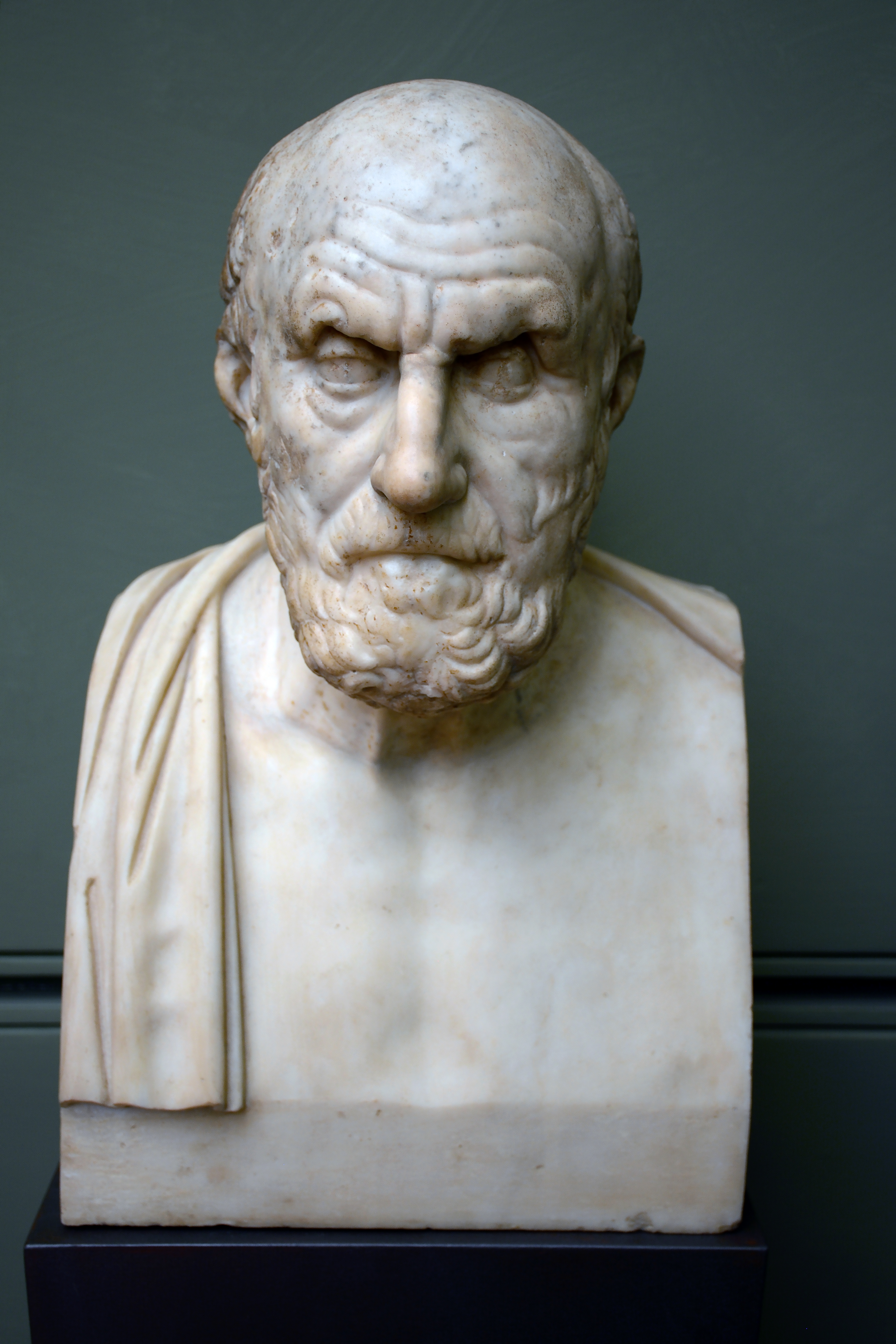
Bust of Chrysippus, Uffizi Gallery, Florence

Stoicism is a school of philosophy which began in the 3rd-century BCE. The first head (scholarch) of the school, Zeno of Citium, began teaching around 300 BCE, and laid down most of the fundamental doctrines of the school. His successors as head of the school were Cleanthes of Assos and then Chrysippus of Soli. The Stoics grounded their ethics in the belief that the world was rational, ordered, and structured. Only by living according to nature (human nature and cosmic nature) can humans flourish. Since nature is rational, only a life lived according to reason, i.e. according to virtue (aretē), will allow for a life that is smooth, consistent and happy. Failure to reason correctly brings about the occurrence of pathē—a word translated as passions, emotions, or affections. The Greek word pathos was a wide-ranging term indicating an infliction one suffers. The Stoics used the word to discuss generic emotions such as anger, fear and joy. The word passion is often used as a translation of pathos so as not to suggest that the Stoics wanted to be rid of all feeling. However the Stoics were often talking straightforwardly about common emotions.

The Stoics beginning with Zeno arranged the passions under four headings: distress (lupē), pleasure (hēdonē), fear (phobos) and desire (epithumia). Two of these (distress and pleasure) refer to passions currently present, and two of these (fear and desire) refer to passions directed at the future. Under these four headings can be found specific emotions such as anger, longing, envy, grief, and pride.

Philosophers from the time of Plato had allowed for irrational impulses in the soul, but the Stoics saw the soul as a unified rational whole with a central ruling centre (hegemonikon). Thus the Stoics were the first philosophers to identify all emotions with judgements. A passion is a mistaken opinion. A passion has a passive aspect in that it brings suffering, but it also has an active aspect which the Stoics saw as an impulse (hormē), one which is excessive and disobedient to reason. The wise person who is free from the passions (apatheia) instead experiences good emotions (eupatheia) which are clear-headed feelings.

It was against this background that Chrysippus wrote his therapeutic work On Passions. Cleanthes had maintained that to quell a passion such as fear, all one had to do was demonstrate that the emotion had nothing to do with what is bad. However, as a form of therapy this was inadequate, and Chrysippus set himself the task of writing a treatise on the theory and therapy of emotions.

== Sources ==
The principal source for the On Passions is the polemical commentary by Galen in his On the Doctrines of Hippocrates and Plato which contains most of the surviving quotations. The other main source is Cicero's Tusculan Disputations Book IV which contains a discussion of the Stoic passions which is derived from Chrysippus. A small amount of supplementary information is provided by writers such as Diogenes Laërtius, Stobaeus, Calcidius, and Origen.

=== Galen ===
Galen quotes Chrysippus' On Passions around seventy times in his On the Doctrines of Hippocrates and Plato, thus preserving up to twenty percent of the text. Galen wrote On the Doctrines of Hippocrates and Plato to examine the main doctrines of Hippocrates and Plato and to demonstrate their truth and agreement (as Galen saw it). Plato had divided the soul into three parts representing reason, anger, and appetite. Since Chrysippus was the main representative of the Stoic view that the soul was unitary, Galen devotes most of the fourth and fifth books of his nine-volume treatise attacking the On Passions of Chrysippus.

Galen maintains that most philosophers including Pythagoras, Aristotle and even many Stoics agreed with Plato's division of the soul, even if some of them understood the division in terms of powers rather than as parts. His goal is to show that Chrysippus represents a deviant position. He claims that Zeno and Cleanthes were really on Plato's side, but the evidence he presents is very meagre. He accepts he has little evidence for Zeno, and the only evidence he provides for Cleanthes is a brief versified dialogue between anger and reason which he thinks shows that Cleanthes accepted an irrational part of the soul.

Throughout his polemic, Galen draws heavily on the Stoic philosopher Posidonius (1st-century BCE) who wrote his own On Passions as a commentary on Chrysippus. Galen claims Posidonius accepted an irrational part of the soul, although Posidonius may have held a more Stoic position than Galen admits to. Galen selects and quotes passages out of context, and he often shows incomprehension in his understanding of Chrysippus.

=== Cicero ===
Cicero uses Chrysippus' On Passions as a major source for the fourth book of his Tusculan Disputations. Some passages in his third book are also drawn from the same source. Cicero may well have used an epitome made by a later Stoic rather than the full text. He provides extra details not mentioned by Galen, and is comparatively unbiased. However, there are no direct quotations from Chrysippus in Cicero's account; he mixes in material drawn from other philosophy schools; and he intersperses his own comments.

Cicero complains that Chrysippus devotes most of his efforts on theory and not therapy, but Cicero has a narrow definition of therapy: a strategy for helping someone in the sudden grip of emotion. Cicero is nevertheless a useful source for the practical side of Chrysippus' therapy, and its focus on prevention. Galen neglects this aspect because his aim is to attack the theory.

== Contents ==
Although On Passions is one of the best attested works by Chrysippus, large sections of the work are lost. Galen appears to have only read, and made direct use of, Books 1 and 4. He derives his account of Book 2 entirely from the commentary of Posidonius, and he is silent about Book 3. The epitome used by Cicero may itself have been a summary of Books 1 and 4. This means that most of the surviving quotations are from Books 1 and 4 and our knowledge of Book 3 is non-existent.

Galen refers to the first three books as the theoretical books (logika). Book 4 was known separately as the Therapeutics (Greek: θεραπευτικόν)—a title which apparently goes back to Chrysippus, and it had some status as a stand-alone text. In Book 1 Chrysippus discusses the definitions of passion which had been laid down by Zeno, and analyses its various types. In Book 2 he examines the difficulties raised by everyday experience. Book 4 treats the therapy of the passions, although it too contains theory, summarising some of the material from Book 1. Theory itself plays an important role in Stoic therapy.

=== Book 1 ===
In Book 1 Chrysippus begins with the definitions of passion which had been laid down by Zeno. Zeno had written his own work On Passions which had examined emotions based on common opinions held about them. Zeno defined passion as "an irrational and unnatural motion of the soul" and "an excessive impulse". Chrysippus stresses that "irrational" here means "disobedient to reason and having turned away from reason." Acting emotionally is not being overcome by a lower non-rational part of the soul. Chrysippus compares an excessive impulse to a runner whose legs have such impetus that the runner cannot immediately will them to a halt:

In walking according to impulse the movement of the legs is not excessive, but is in a sense coextensive with the impulse so that it can come to a standstill when he [the walker] wishes, or change direction. But in the case of those who are running according to impulse, this sort of thing is no longer the case. The movement of the legs exceeds the impulse, so that they are carried away and do not obediently change their pace the moment they set out to do so. I think something similar happens also in impulses because of an excess beyond the rational measure, so that when someone exercises the impulse that person is not obedient to reason; and whereas the excess in running is termed contrary to the impulse, the excess in impulse is termed contrary to reason.

— Chrysippus, quoted by Galen.

An excessive emotion is like a runner who is out-of-control because of external causes. In the case of out-of-control mind the external causes are external appearances, which when impressed upon a weakened mind result in a corresponding passion.

Zeno, again borrowing from common usage, had added a third definition of passion as a "fluttering of the soul". For the Stoics all bodily processes have a material, corporeal cause, which for Chrysippus as well as Zeno meant physical movements in the soul.

Having dealt with Zeno's three definitions of passion, Chrysippus passes on to the four generic passions as defined by Zeno. Zeno had defined distress as the opinion that one is in the presence of evil. The intensity of the distress is affected by the soul's resilience and the scale of the experience. Chrysippus adds that the opinion needs to be fresh to explain why distress can fade with time. Chrysippus defines distress as a shrinking before what is thought to be a thing to avoid, and pleasure as a swelling at what is thought to be a thing to choose.

=== Book 2 ===
In Book 2 Chrysippus moves beyond Zeno's definitions to discuss various problems concerning passions. For Chrysippus emotions are judgements: a judgement that something good or bad is at hand and that it is appropriate to act accordingly. Thus a passion consists of two propositions: (1) this is something good/bad and (2) it is right that one should be affected by it. In the case of distress, people believe that (1) something bad has befallen them, and (2) that one should shrink before it, producing not only the inner pain but the outward signs of distress such as weeping.

Eventually the distress diminishes which indicates a weakening of the second proposition, however the first proposition may remain in place. Thus one may stop mourning the death of a loved-one while still believing their death to be an evil. Chrysippus understands this in terms of abatement of inflammation, in much the same way a fever abates. The Stoics saw passions as a type of illness, so the medical analogy is deliberate.

Chrysippus acknowledges that some emotional responses are not easily reasoned out. For example, it is possible that both judgements may be present but that the manifestations of distress do not ensue. Chrysippus explains this as being due to other causal factors acting which we may be unaware of or whose origin may be unclear. This might include underlying characteristics of the mind, or the extent to which other errors have become entrenched in the mind.

Chrysippus also discusses the origin of evil, and why children, even those brought up virtuously, become corrupted. Chrysippus relates this to his principle of oikeiôsis. Children are born in a natural state which should lead to goodness and virtue. However, the pursuit of pleasure and the avoidance of pain become associated from an early age with the supreme good. A similar process occurs with wealth and fame. Thus physical factors such as pleasure and pain, as well as societal pressures, hamper our natural development. The Stoics equated evil with the passions, and corruption arises in regards to good and evil because of "the persuasiveness of appearances and conversation."

=== Book 4: Therapeutics ===
Chrysippus states near the beginning of Book 4 that just as there is an art called medicine concerned with the diseased body, so there is an equivalent art associated with the diseased mind. This is not just an analogy: a passion is a real illness brought on from the mind's deviation from its natural state. The soul's condition depends on physiological processes in the body. Chrysippus directly relates this to medical ideas concerning pneuma as the 'breath' that makes up the soul, and a passion involves a disturbance in the balance of the classical elements which make up the body and between physical principles such as hot and cold. Given this material relationship between body and soul, Chrysippus emphasizes the need for bodily health, and advocates a plain, simple diet.

Chrysippus discusses the passions by quoting Greek literature. Thus in his examination of anger he makes use of Euripides' Medea:

I understand what evils I am about to do,
But anger (thymos) is stronger than my sound considerations

— Medea 1078–1079.

Here Chrysippus explains Medea's anger in terms of akrasia: a word meaning weak-will or incontinence. Akrasia is not an irrational force within the soul, instead it is the mind identifying with a bad reason against one's better judgement. During emotional conflict reason oscillates between rival judgements. Wrong reason will reside simultaneously in the mind with right reason. In Medea's case she chooses the option rooted in anger, which is thus wrong reason. Chrysippus once again explains this loss of control in terms of "runners who go counter to their impulse in running and [hence] in persons angered counter to their own reason."

Someone in the midst of an emotional crisis rejects right reason and cannot be easily helped. Chrysippus gives many examples of anger and other emotions such as people biting keys and kicking a door when it fails to open, or taking out anger on inanimate objects such as balls of wool. Such a person will appear changed to those people around them (i.e. people still in possession of right reason) and they can not be treated as the person they normally are. Similarly someone in the throes of love will reject good counsel whatever the price may be. They may recognise right reason, yet they will reject it. The passions obscure, they cause a mental clouding, a madness. They put an end to deliberation, leaving just one option as irresistible.

Only recovery from this mental clouding permits deliberation and the return of right reason. Chrysippus describes two forms of treatment: (1) treating passions which have arisen, and (2) preventing passions from arising. Chrysippus stresses that the therapy of the first type has only limited value, to be used as a temporary measure.

For even in the case of distress, not every form is soothed by the same method: one remedy should be applied for grief, a different remedy for pity or envy. ... To be sure, all emotions of that sort could be washed away by that form of consolation which teaches that the circumstances which give rise to gladness or desire are not goods, and those which give rise to fear or distress are not evils. But the specific and more reliable cure is when you teach that the emotions are wrong in and of themselves and have nothing either natural or necessary about them.

— Tusculan Disputations, iv. 59–60

Thus his therapy is preventative. Since a passion is a temporary outbreak reflecting the diseased nature of the mind, therapy itself must be directed at the underlying disease. Chrysippus advocates the practice of 'dwelling in advance'—that is trying to foresee the numerous difficulties that life offers. Chrysippus gives two reasons for the impact of unexpected events: (1) that we have no time to assess the magnitude of the event, and (2) that we feel guilty for not having anticipated it:

Chrysippus is of the same view, I know: what is unforeseen strikes us with greater force. But there is more to it than that. It is true that a sudden assault of the enemy creates rather more confusion than an expected one, and that a sudden storm at sea strikes more fear into those on shipboard than if they had seen it coming, and there are many similar cases. But if you were to study such events carefully and scientifically, what you would find, quite simply, is that when things happen suddenly, they invariably seem more serious than they otherwise would. There are two reasons for this. First, there is not enough time to gauge the seriousness of what is happening. Second, we sometimes think that if we had foreseen what was to happen, we might have been able to prevent it, and then our distress is keener because compounded with guilt.

— Tusculan Disputations, iii. 52

Thus the primary cause of distress is unforeseen events, and we need the ability to respond rationally instead of straight away assenting to appearances. Chrysippean therapy focuses on contemplation; training and improving the mind; strengthening the soul. The theory teaches us that the passions are misguided judgements, and thus are voluntary. It is the task of therapy to teach that these judgements have a wrong valuation, mistaking indifferent things for good or evil.

== Cicero's Tusculan Disputations ==
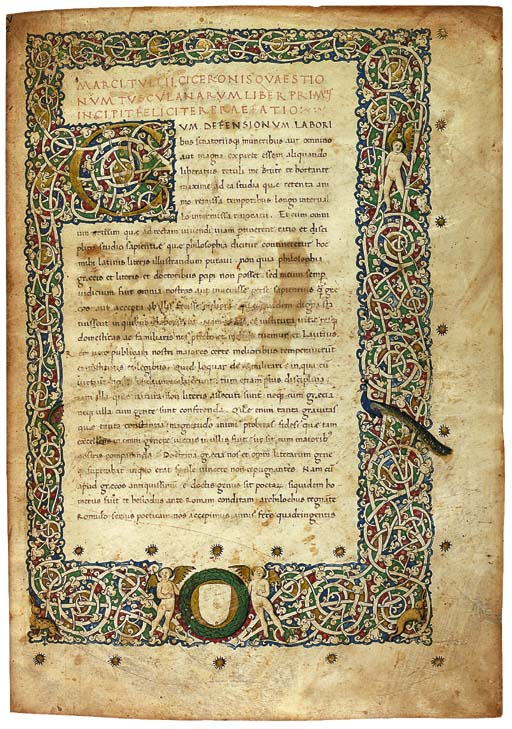
Tusculan Disputations, 15th-century illuminated manuscript

Cicero made use of On Passions, probably in epitome form, for his Tusculan Disputations. Most of his testimony can be found in the fourth book of the Tusculans, especially the coherent section at §11–33 and a rather muddled section at §58–81. A few extra passages can be found in Cicero's third book.^{[a]}

=== Book IV ===
Apart from the introduction (§1–10) and the conclusion (§82–84), Tusculan Disputations Book 4 can be divided into three parts, two of which are derived from Chrysippus' On Passions. The other part is a critique of the Peripatetic theory of moderate emotions at §34–57. Although Stoic, this central section is drawn from some other source.

==== §11–33 ====
This first section closely parallels Galen's account of Books 1 and 4 of On Passions. Cicero begins (§11) with Zeno's first two definitions of emotion, and moves on to an overview of the four generic passions as well as the three good-feelings attributable to the Stoic Sage (§14). He lists (§15) four physical effects of the four passions not found in Galen's account. He follows this (§16–21) with a lengthy catalogue of the emotions arranged under the headings of the four main passions—a list which is again missing from Galen. He then (§22) highlights the concept of akrasia (Latin: intemperamentia) as the source of the passions.

Cicero then (§23–32) moves on to material which is drawn from the Therapeutics. It begins (§23) with a statement about how disturbances of the mind are like those of the body, and how the soul is disturbed by conflicting opinions. Cicero provides (§25–26) definitions and examples of the various passions. He explains (§27–28) the analogy between body and soul, and between disease and health. He describes (§31) the limitations of the analogy (a healthy soul cannot become diseased like a healthy body can); and explains (§32) how the clever are less prone to sickness.

==== §58–81 ====
In this section Cicero returns to the subject of therapy. However, although much of the material is sourced from Chrysippus, Cicero interweaves some Peripatetic ideas; adds his own remarks; and sources his own quotations from the Latin poets.

After an introduction (§58), Cicero explains (§59–62) the Chrysippean position that one should direct treatment at the passion itself rather than the external cause. He then (§64–65) discusses passions caused by (supposedly) bad and good things respectively. Cicero add his own digression on the opinions offered by different philosophers. He then (§68–76) moves on to the theme of erotic love. Many of these ideas come from Chrysippus, but Cicero uses examples drawn from Latin poetry instead of the Greek poets. The therapeutic ideas (§74–75) about introducing distractions or substituting a new lover for an old one are presumably part of Cicero's "Peripatetic" cures. The next subject (§77–81) treats anger, again drawing his ideas from Chrysippus.

=== Book III ===
Cicero's Tusculan Disputations Book 3 is focused on the alleviation of distress rather than the passions generally. Cicero draws on many Stoic themes, some of which may be derived from Chrysippus. This includes a medical analogy (§1), and passions as forms of madness (§7–13). However, only a few passages can be directly attributed to On Passions. Of particular value is §52 which contains the doctrine of dwelling in advance which is directly attributed to Chrysippus. This can be supplemented with §29 which contains a Euripides' quote probably used by Chrysippus on the same theme. Other Chrysippean passages include a derivation of the word distress (lupē) at §61, and his therapy concerning mourning at §76 and §79.

== Legacy ==
Chrysippus became a preeminent authority for the Stoic school, eclipsing his predecessors. Writers as doctrinally far-apart as Philodemus and Origen quote from his On Passions. Galen himself states that the Stoics of his day followed Chrysippus.

=== Posidonius ===
Posidonius wrote his own On Passions expanding on the treatise of Chrysippus. Almost everything which is known about the work is drawn from Galen's remarks. Galen claims Posidonius allowed for an irrational part of the soul. It is possible Posidonius did hold this position although it would have been at variance with mainstream Stoic thought, not just that of Chrysippus. Cicero, who had personally known Posidonius, shows no awareness of a disagreement between Posidonius and Chrysippus.

Among the difficulties Posidonius wanted to explain were: how impulses become excessive; why different people vary in their emotional reactions; why emotions fade through time, yet judgements can remain intact; and why the manifestations of distress can be so unpredictable. In many cases the disagreement which Galen reports between Posidonius and Chrysippus may in fact have been attempts by Posidonius to refine and corroborate the Stoic position of Chrysippus. For example, Posidonius wanted to explain variations in emotional reactions: why do some people react inappropriately in the face of an emotion and others do not? Posidonius may have argued that human minds are predisposed to various emotional movements without necessarily being irrational.

=== Seneca ===
The influence of Chrysippus on Seneca is clearest in his long essay On Anger (Latin: De Ira). Seneca distinguishes three stages of anger as part of a chronological sequence. The first stage is shock, an initial agitation or movement which is involuntary. In the second stage the mind assents to appearance of injustice, and that it is thus appropriate to respond with vindictiveness. In the third stage the emotion is released. Reason, which was still present in the second stage is now let go and the mind turns away from it. Since the first stage is involuntary and the third stage lacks reason, therapy has to be directed at the second stage—only here can one recognise the nature of the shock and side with reason.

=== Epictetus ===
Epictetus tells his students to train themselves in their use of appearances through a series of exercises. This includes questioning whether a grand or beautiful passer-by involves something good, or whether a bereaved or hungry person has encountered something bad. Epictetus makes a sharp distinction between things in our power (eph' hēmin) and not in our power. Anything in our power is defined narrowly as our will or volition (prohairesis). This includes our judgements and desires, but nothing external such as our bodies. The influence of Chrysippus is obvious in a Discourse (ii. 18) on the correct use of impressions, where he explains how diseases grow in the mind in a manner very similar to a Chrysippean passage quoted by Cicero (Tusc. Disp. iv. 24):

It is in this way, of course, that moral infirmities grow up in the mind, as philosophers explain. For once you've come to feel a desire for money, if reason is brought to bear in such a way as to make us become aware of the evil, the desire will be suppressed and our ruling centre will be restored to its original authority; but if you apply no remedy, it won't return to its original state, but when it comes to be aroused again by the corresponding impression, it will become inflamed by desire more rapidly than before. And if this happens repeatedly, a callus will finally be formed, and the infirmity will cause the avarice to become entrenched.

— Epictetus, Discourses, ii. 18. 8–9

== See also ==
- Stoic passions
- Passions (philosophy)

== Notes ==
a. Some older English translations of the Tusculan Disputations use a different numbering scheme for the sections. In these old texts the relevant parts of book IV, §11–33 and §58–81, are sections 6–14 and 27–37. For Book III, §29 and §52 are at sections 14 and 22. The other three passages §61, §76, §79 are at 25, 31, and 33.
