= Nonattachment (philosophy) =

Philosophy of avoiding unnecessary pain

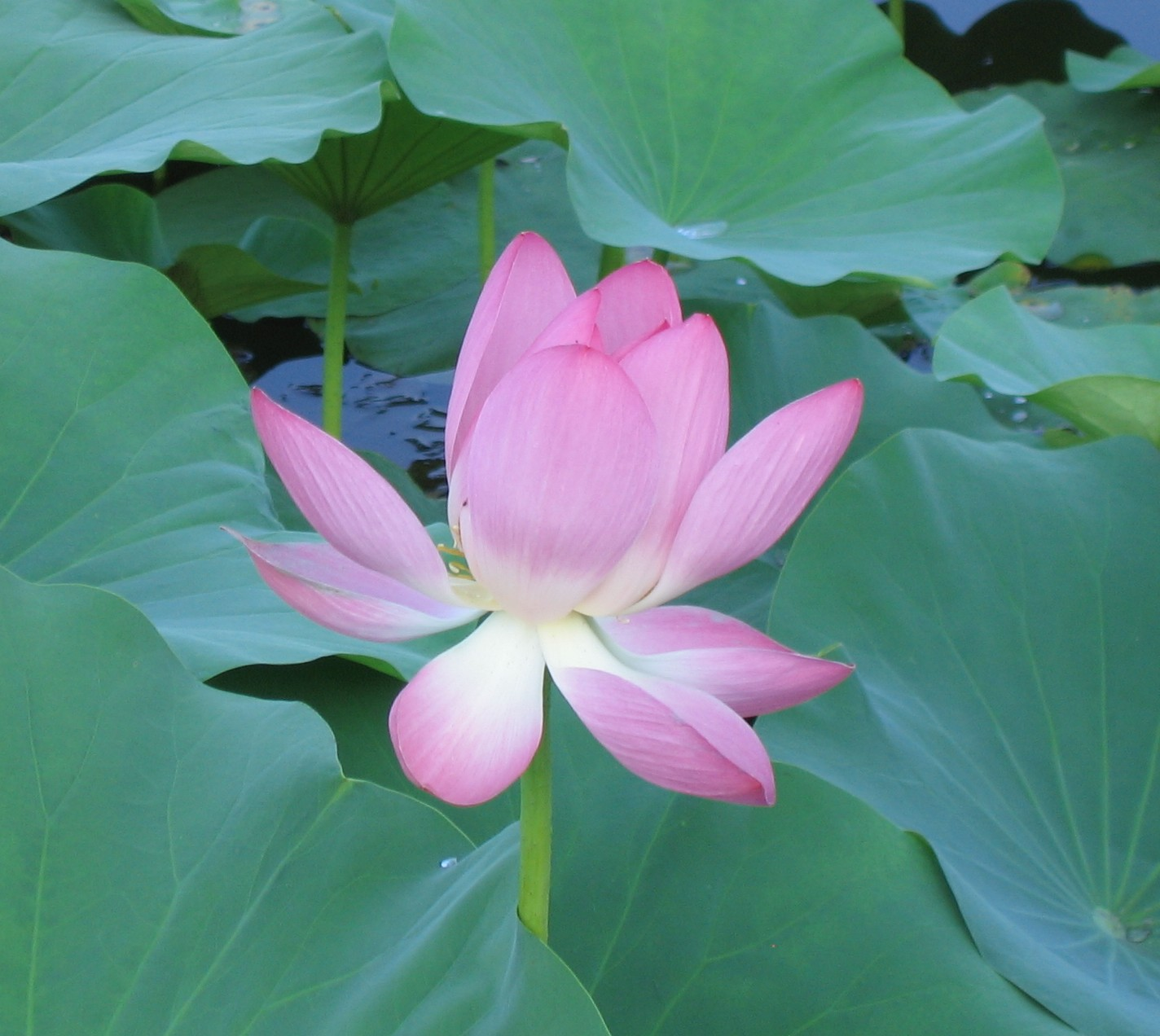
The lotus symbolizes non-attachment in some religions in Asia owing to its ability to grow in muddy waters yet produce an immaculate flower.

Nonattachment, non-attachment, or detachment is a state in which a person overcomes their emotional attachment to or desire for things, people, or worldly concerns and thus attains a heightened perspective. It is considered a wise virtue and is promoted in various Eastern religions, such as Buddhism, Hinduism, Jainism and Taoism. It is also a key concept in Christian spirituality (often referred to by the Greek term apatheia), where it signifies a detachment from worldly objects and concerns.

== Importance of the term ==
Detachment as release from desire and consequently from suffering is an important principle, or even ideal, in Baháʼí Faith, Buddhism, Hinduism, Jainism, Stoicism and Taoism.

In Buddhist and Hindu religious texts the opposite concept is expressed as upādāna, translated as "attachment". Attachment—that is, the inability to practice or embrace detachment—is viewed as the main obstacle towards a serene and fulfilled life. Many other spiritual traditions identify attachment with the continuous worries and restlessness produced by desire and personal ambitions.

== Baháʼí Faith ==
Thou hast inquired about detachment. It is well known to thee that by detachment is intended the detachment of the soul from all else but God. That is, it consisted in soaring up to an eternal station, wherein nothing that can be seen between heaven and earth deterreth the seeker from the Absolute Truth. In other words, he is not veiled from divine love or from busying himself with the mention of God by the love of any other thing or by his immersion therein.

— Bahá'u'lláh, Bayán-i-Hadíth-i-Sharíf, 'Man 'arafa nafsahú faqad 'arafa Rabbahú' (Commentary on the tradition "He who knoweth his self hath known his Lord")

The second definition is in the Words of Wisdom:

The essence of detachment is for man to turn his face towards the courts of the Lord, to enter His Presence, behold His Countenance, and stand as witness before Him.

— Tablets of Baha'u'llah, p. 155

== Buddhism ==
Regarding the concept of detachment, or non-attachment, Buddhist texts in Pali mention nekkhamma, a word generally translated as "renunciation". This word also conveys more specifically the meaning of "giving up the world and leading a holy life" or "freedom from lust, craving, and desires."

The writings of Milarepa are canonical Mahayana Buddhist texts that emphasize the temporary nature of the physical body and the need for non-attachment.

Detachment is a central concept in Zen Buddhist philosophy. One of the most important technical Chinese terms for detachment is "wú niàn" (無念), which literally means "no thought." This does not signify the literal absence of thought, but rather the state of being "unstained" (bù rán 不染) by thought. Therefore, "detachment" is being detached from one's thoughts. It is to separate oneself from one's own thoughts and opinions in detail as to not be harmed mentally and emotionally by them.

== Christianity ==
Eastern Christian monasticism cultivated practices of detached watchfulness which were designed to calm the passions and lead to an ongoing state of calm detachment known as apatheia.

In Western Christianity, Ignatian spirituality encourages detachment, sometimes referred to as indifference, in order to maximize a person's availability to God and to their neighbors.

== Hinduism ==
The Hindu view of detachment comes from the understanding of the nature of existence. The true ultimate state sought is that of being in the moment: While one is responsible and active, one does not worry about the past or future. The detachment is towards the result of one's actions rather than towards everything in life. This concept is cited extensively within Puranic and Vedic literature, for example:

One who performs his duty without attachment, surrendering the results unto the Supreme Lord, is unaffected by sinful action, as the lotus is untouched by muddy water.

— Bhagavad Gita 5.10:

Vairagya is a Hindu term which is often translated as detachment.

== Jainism ==
Detachment is one of the supreme ideals of Jainism, along with non-violence. Non-possession/non-attachment is one of the Mahavratas, the five great vows that Jain monks observe. Detachment is meaningful if accompanied by the knowledge of self as a soul; moreover, it can serve as the means for attaining self realization. According to Jain saint Shrimad Rajchandra, for those who are lifeless ritualists, mere bodily restraint does not help in attaining self-realization — detachment and such other attributes are necessary. Therefore, he suggests one should undertake such activities, but one must not get stuck there. One cannot get rid of the root cause of birth and death without self-realization. As such, a Jain must understand and apply detachment for the purpose of gaining realization. However, he states that if one bears hardships that do not lead to a reduction in defilement, one strays from the path to liberation.

== Stoicism ==
The Christian practices of detachment derive from ancient Greek philosophy, most notably Stoicism. According to the Stoics, apatheia, which can be translated as "equanimity", was the quality that characterized the sage.

Whereas Aristotle had claimed that virtue was to be found in the golden mean between an excess and a deficiency of emotion (metriopatheia), the Stoics thought that living virtuously provided freedom from the passions, resulting in apatheia. It meant eradicating the tendency to react emotionally or egotistically to external events, the things that cannot be controlled. For Stoics, it was the optimally rational response to the world, for things cannot be controlled if they are caused by the will of others or by Nature; only one's own will can be controlled. That did not mean a loss of feeling, or total disengagement from the world. The Stoic who performs correct (virtuous) judgments and actions as part of the world order experiences contentment (eudaimonia) and good feelings (eupatheia).

== Taoism ==
The Tao Te Ching expresses the concept (in chapter 44) as:

Be content with what you have; rejoice in the way things are. When you realize there is nothing lacking, the whole world belongs to you

== See also ==
- Neutrality
