= Cephalocentric hypothesis =

Ancient Greek doctrine that the brain is the seat of the mind

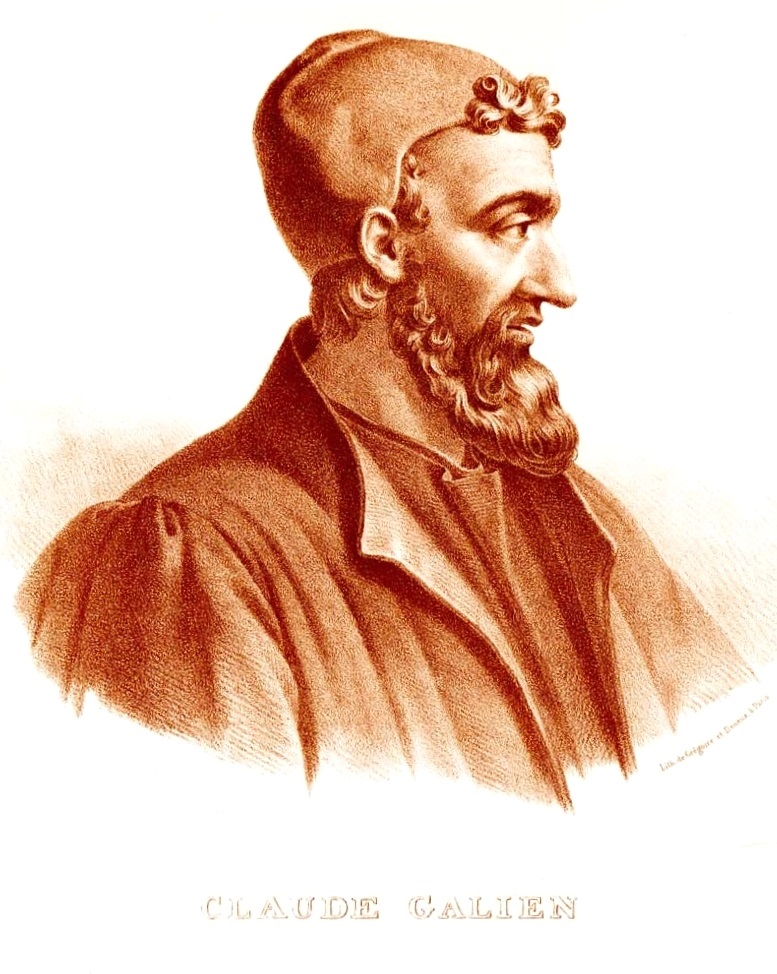
Lithograph of Galen of Pergamon by Pierre-Roch Vigneron (c. 1865). Galen's anatomical work in the second century CE consolidated the cephalocentric position.

The cephalocentric hypothesis, also called cephalocentrism, encephalocentrism or cerebrocentrism, is the doctrine that the brain is the seat of the mind, consciousness, sensation and cognition. The position was developed in Ancient Greece from the early fifth century BCE and stood in opposition to the cardiocentric hypothesis, which located those faculties in the heart. It is generally traced to the physician Alcmaeon of Croton and was taken up by the Hippocratic author of On the Sacred Disease, Plato, and the Alexandrian anatomists Herophilus and Erasistratus. The anatomical and experimental work of Galen of Pergamon in the second century CE provided the basis on which it eventually prevailed. Crivellato and Ribatti describe cephalocentrism as a foundational doctrine in the early history of neuroscience and neuropsychology.

== Etymology and terminology ==
The term combines the Greek κεφαλή (kephalē, "head") with the suffix -centric. The synonyms encephalocentrism (from ἐγκέφαλος, enkephalos, "brain") and cerebrocentrism are used interchangeably in the history-of-neuroscience literature.

== Background ==
In Ancient Egypt the heart was treated as the seat of consciousness and intelligence; during mummification the brain was extracted and discarded while the heart was preserved as the more valuable organ. The earliest Greek treatment of the question, in the Homeric poems of about the eighth century BCE, likewise placed thought and emotion in the chest rather than the head. The competing localizations remained the central problem in Greek discussion of the hegemonikon, or ruling faculty of the soul, for many centuries. The cephalocentric position came to be defined against the cardiocentric position systematized in the fourth century BCE by Aristotle, who held the heart to be the seat of sensation and intellect and treated the brain as a cooling organ.

== Alcmaeon of Croton ==
The cephalocentric position is generally attributed to Alcmaeon of Croton, a Presocratic physician active in the early fifth century BCE who is credited with the first systematic dissections of animal corpses. Alcmaeon held that all the senses are connected with the brain by channel-like structures he called πόροι (poroi), among them two ducts joining the eyes to the brain that are generally identified with the optic nerves. He argued that the brain is the seat of perception on the grounds that sensation is impaired when the brain is moved or displaced, an inference often interpreted as a reference to head injury and concussion. Doxographic sources also credit him with the view that the brain houses the highest faculty of the soul and with distinguishing sensation from understanding.

== Hippocratic and Platonic support ==
The position was taken up in the late fifth century BCE in the Hippocratic Corpus, most notably in the treatise On the Sacred Disease, whose anonymous author argued that epilepsy has a natural cause located in the brain and identified the brain as responsible, alongside intelligence, for pleasure, pain, grief, and aesthetic judgment. Other Hippocratic passages note that wounds to one side of the head produce convulsions on the opposite side of the body, and that loss of speech can accompany paralysis of the right side, observations later identified as an early notice of contralateral motor control. In the Timaeus, Plato (c. 427 – c. 347 BCE) placed the immortal rational soul in the head, which he described as the most divine part of the body, and connected the word enkephalos ("brain") to kephalē ("head") as the vessel that contained it; the mortal souls of emotion and appetite were located in the chest and abdomen.

== Alexandrian anatomy and Galen ==
In Ptolemaic Alexandria in the third century BCE, Herophilus of Chalcedon and Erasistratus performed the first documented systematic dissections of the human body. Herophilus distinguished the cerebrum from the cerebellum, described the ventricular system and located the hegemonikon in the fourth ventricle; both Alexandrians identified separate sensory and motor nerves as originating from the brain and spinal cord. Erasistratus is also reported to have related human intelligence to the number and complexity of the convolutions of the brain. The view was consolidated by Galen (c. 129 – c. 216 CE), whose vivisection experiments on pigs showed that section of the recurrent laryngeal nerves abolished vocalization; Gross has characterised the demonstration as the first experimental evidence that the brain controls behaviour. On the same anatomical basis Galen argued against the cardiocentric position of Stoic philosophers, including Zeno of Citium and Chrysippus, holding that it rested on rhetoric and word etymology rather than dissection.

== Legacy ==
Although Aristotelian cardiocentrism persisted into the early modern period, the cephalocentric position ultimately became the basis of modern neurology and neuropsychology, with the brain accepted as the organ of mind and the centre of the nervous system. The neuroscientist Robert W. Doty likened Alcmaeon's identification of the brain as the source of mind to the Copernican and Darwinian revolutions in human knowledge.

== See also ==
- Cardiocentric hypothesis
- History of neuroscience
- History of neuropsychology
- Hegemonikon
- Alcmaeon of Croton
- Mind–body problem
