= Cardiocentric hypothesis =

Obsolete medical theory

According to the cardiocentric hypothesis, the heart is the primary location of human emotions, cognition, and awareness. This notion may be traced back to ancient civilizations such as Egypt and Greece, where the heart was regarded not only as a physical organ but also as a repository of emotions and wisdom. Aristotle, a well-known Greek philosopher in this field, contributed to the notion by thinking the heart to be the centre of both emotions and intellect. He believed that the heart was the center of the psycho-physiological system and that it was responsible for controlling sensation, thought, and body movement. He also observed that the heart was the origin of the veins in the body and that the existence of pneuma in the heart was to function as a messenger, traveling through blood vessels to produce sensation. This point of view remained throughout history, spanning the Middle Ages and Renaissance, influencing medical and intellectual debate.

An opposing theory called "cephalocentrism", which proposed that the brain played the dominant role in controlling the body, was first introduced by Pythagoras in 550 BC, who argued that the soul resides in the brain and is immortal. His statements were supported by Plato, Hippocrates, and Galen of Pergamon. Plato believed that the body is a "prison" of the mind and soul and that in death the mind and soul become separated from the body, meaning that neither one of them could die.

== History ==
=== Ancient Egypt ===
Weighing of the heart

In ancient Egypt, people believed that the heart is the seat of the soul and the origin of the channels to all other parts of the body, including arteries, veins, nerves, and tendons. The heart was also depicted as determining the fate of ancient Egyptians after they died. It was believed that Anubis, the god of mummification, would weigh the deceased person's heart against a feather. If the heart was too heavy, it would be considered guilty and consumed by the Ammit, a mythological creature. If it was lighter than the feather, the spirit of the deceased would be allowed to go to heaven. Therefore, the heart was kept in the mummy while other organs were generally removed.

=== Ancient Near East ===
In the ancient Near East, the heart (libbu) was considered the seat of consciousness, moral agency, cognition, wisdom, understanding, and of the emotions subject to the will (desire, love, friendship, etc). Emotional expressions in Mesopotamian texts link a positive relationship between the heart and the occurrence of feelings of pride, desire, love, and notions of sexual arousal and shame. Idioms like "his heart is awake" were used to describe an individual regaining their consciousness, and "as it pleases the heart" could be used to describe the sensation of pleasure that one experiences. The heart is the source of both the good and evil in a person, as well as the center of the human capacity of religiosity.

=== Ancient Greece ===
However, the ancient Greeks, Aristotle promoted the cardiocentric hypothesis based on his experience with animal dissection. He found that certain primitive animals could move and feel without the brain, and so deduced that the brain was not responsible for movement or feeling. Apart from that, he pointed out that the brain was at the top of the body, far from the centre of the body, and felt cold. He also performed anatomical examinations after strangling the specimen, which would cause vasoconstriction of the arterioles in the lungs. This likely had the effect of forcing blood to engorge the veins and make them more visible in the following dissection. Aristotle observed that the heart was the origin of the veins in the body, and concluded that the heart was the centre of the psycho-physiological system. He also stated that the existence of pneuma in the heart was to function as a messenger, traveling through blood vessels to produce sensation. Movement of body parts was thought to be controlled by the heart as well. From Aristotle's perspective, the heart was composed of sinews which allowed the body to move.

In the fourth century BC, Diocles of Carystus reasserted that the heart was the physiological centre of sensation and thought. He also recognised that the heart had two cardiac ears. Although Diocles also proposed that the left brain was responsible for intelligence and the right one was for sensation, he believed that the heart was dominant over the brain for listening and understanding. Praxagoras of Cos was a follower of Aristotle's cardiocentric theory and was the first one to distinguish arteries and veins. He conjectured that arteries carry pneuma while transporting blood. He also proved that a pulse can be detected from the arteries and explained that the arteries' ends narrowed into nerves.

Lucretius stated around 55 BCE, "The dominant force in the whole body is that guiding principle which we term mind or intellect. This is firmly lodged in the midregion of the breast. Here is the place where fear and alarm pulsate. Here is felt the caressing touch of joy. Here, then, is the seat of the intellect and the mind."

=== Christian world ===
According to the Mystic Treatises of Isaac the Syrian, "the heart is the central organ of the inward senses; this means the sense of senses, because it is the root. And if the root is holy, so also are all the branches."

=== Islamic world ===
Cardiocentrism is accepted in the Quran.

The Islamic philosopher and physician Avicenna followed Galen of Pergamon, believing that one's spirit was confined in three chambers of the brain and accepted that nerves originate from the brain and spinal cord, which control body movement and sensation. However, he maintained the earlier cardiocentric hypothesis. He stated that activation for voluntary movement began in the heart and was then transported to the brain. Similarly, messages were delivered from a peripheral environment to the brain and then via the vagus nerve to the heart.

=== Europe ===
In the Middle Ages, the German Catholic friar Albertus Magnus made contributions to physiology and biology. His treatise was based on Galen's cephalocentric theory and was profoundly affected by Avicenna's preeminent Canon, which itself had been influenced by Aristotle. He combined these ideas in a new way which suggested that nerves branched off from the brain but that the origin was the heart. He concluded that philosophically, all matters originated from the heart, and in the corporeal explanation, all nerves started from the brain.

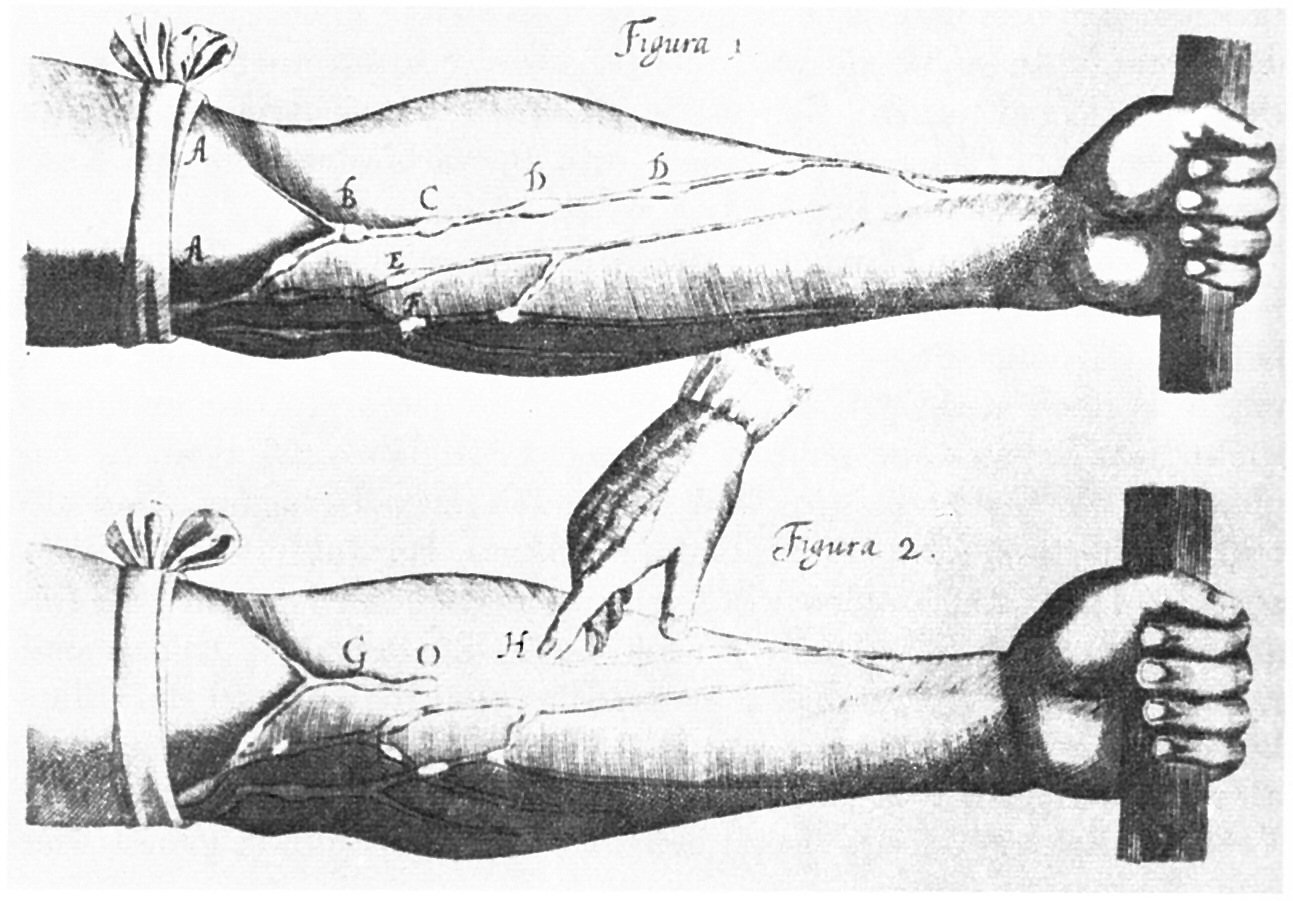
Image of veins by William Harvey

William Harvey, an early modern English physiologist, also agreed with Aristotle's cardiocentric view. He was the first to describe the basic operation of the circulatory system, by which blood was pumped by the heart to the rest of the body, in detail. He explained that the heart was the centre of the body and the source of life in his treatise De Motu Cordis et Sanguinis in Animalibus.

== Cephalocentric perspective ==
The opposing doctrine, the cephalocentric hypothesis, held that the brain is the seat of mind, sensation and cognition. It was developed from the early fifth century BCE by Alcmaeon of Croton, the author of the Hippocratic On the Sacred Disease, Plato, the Alexandrian anatomists Herophilus and Erasistratus, and Galen of Pergamon, whose vivisection experiments gave it the experimental basis on which it eventually prevailed.

Galen of Pergamon was a biologist and physician. His approach to the investigation of the brain was due to his rigorous anatomical methodology. He pointed out that only correct dissection will support the incontrovertible statement. He reached the conclusion that the brain was responsible for sensation and thought, and that nerves originated at the spinal cord and brain.

== Brain in heart ==
The "little brain in the heart" is an intricate system of nerve cells that control and regulate the heart's activity. It is also called the intrinsic cardiac nervous system (ICNS). It consists of about 40,000 neurons that form clusters or ganglia around the heart, especially near the top where the blood vessels enter and exit. These neurons communicate with each other and with the brain through chemical and electrical signals.

The intrinsic cardiac nervous system has several functions, such as:

- Adjusting the heart rate and rhythm according to the body's needs and emotions.
- Sensing and responding to changes in blood pressure, oxygen levels, hormones, and inflammation.
- Protecting the heart from damage during a heart attack or other stress.
- Learning and remembering from past experiences and influencing the brain’s memory and emotions.
