= De Ira =

Essay by Seneca

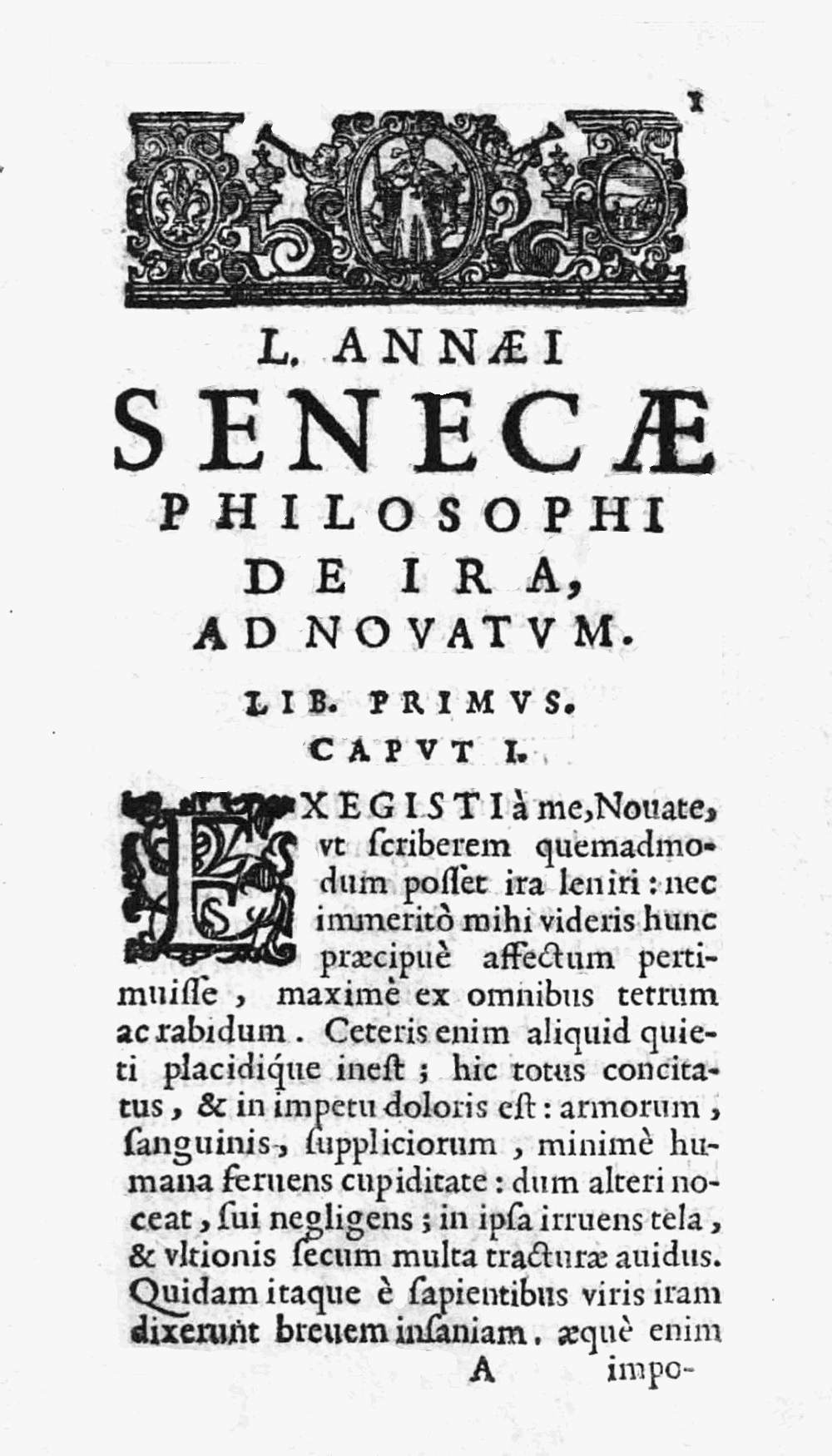
- From the 1643 edition, published by Francesco Baba
- Author: Lucius Annaeus Seneca
- Language: Latin
- Subject: Ethics
- Genre: Philosophy
- Publication date: AD c. 45
- Publication place: Ancient Rome

De Ira (On Anger) is a Latin work by Seneca (4 BC–65 AD). The work defines and explains anger within the context of Stoic philosophy, and offers advice which utilizes virtue and personal improvement in order to prevent anger.

== Sources ==
Seneca's main sources were Stoic. J. Fillion-Lahille has argued that the first book of the De Ira was inspired by the Stoic philosopher Chrysippus' (3rd-century BC) treatise On Passions (Peri Pathôn), whereas the second and third drew mainly from a later Stoic philosopher, Posidonius (1st-century BC), who had also written a treatise On Passions and differed from Chrysippus in giving a bigger role to irrational aspects of the soul. However, more recent research has shown that this view of Posidonius' criticism of Chrysippus was mainly due to Galen's (our main witness for Posidonius' and Chrysippus' now lost works) systematic distortion of their thinking, and that Posidonius' theory of emotions was actually substantially identical with that of Chrysippus. In consequence, although Seneca may have used both treatises by Chrysippus and Posidonius, his main inspiration is now thought to be chrysippean.

Seneca may also have known works written by the Peripatetic philosopher Theophrastus, whom he takes as philosophical adversary in the first book. Parallels have also been suggested with the Epicurean philosopher Philodemus, who had also written a work On Anger.

== Dating ==
The exact date of the writing of the work is unknown, apart from an earliest date (terminum post quem), deduced from repeated references by Seneca to the episodic anger of Caligula, who died 24 January 41 AD. Seneca refers to his brother by his native name, Novatus, rather than his adoptive one, Gallio, which he bore by 52/53 AD, suggesting the work may date from the mid 40s AD.

Book III begins with its own introduction on the horrors of anger, and can be read on its own, which has led to suggestions that it was devised either as a later appendix to the work, or that it was a separate treatise in its own right.

== Title and contents ==
Ira is defined as anger, wrath, rage, ire, passion, indignation – primarily, to be angry.

De Ira consists of three books. It is part of Seneca's series of Dialogi (dialogues). The essay is addressed to Seneca's elder brother, Lucius Annaeus Novatus. The work's first sentence reads:

You have asked me Novatus to write on how anger can be mitigated

Although split into three books, De Ira is effectively divided into two parts. The first part (I–II.17) deals with theoretical questions, whereas the second part (II.18–III end) offers therapeutic advice. The first part begins with a preamble on the horrors of anger, followed by definitions of anger. It continues with questions such as whether anger is natural, whether it can be moderate, whether it is involuntary, and whether it can be erased altogether. The second part (Book II.18 onwards) begins with advice on how the avoidance of bad temper can be taught to both children and adults. This is followed by numerous snippets of advice on how anger can be forestalled or extinguished, and many anecdotes are given of examples to be imitated or avoided. The work concludes with a few tips on mollifying other people, followed by Seneca's summing-up.

== Themes ==
We shouldn't control anger, but destroy it entirely—for what "control" is there for a thing that's fundamentally wicked?

— Seneca, De Ira, iii.42

De Ira is written within the context of Stoicism, which sought to guide people out of a life enslaved to the vices, to the freedom of a life characterised by virtue. This is achievable by the development of an understanding of how to control the passions (Greek: pathê), anger being classified as a passion, and to make these subject to reason. As a Stoic, Seneca believed the relationship of the passions to reason are that the passions arise in a rational mind as a result of a mis-perceiving or misunderstanding of reality. A passion is a defective belief; they occur when the mind makes errors about the values of things.

Seneca states that his therapy has two main aims: one is that we do not become angry (resisting anger), and the other is that we do no wrong when we are angry (restraining anger). Much of the advice is devoted to the first aim of preventing anger. Seneca does offer some practical advice on restraining anger (mostly in III.10–15) although after this he resumes his theme of preventing anger. For the Stoics anger was contrary to human nature, and vengeance considered an evil, which explains Seneca's emphasis on anger prevention. The fact that he offers advice on merely restraining anger shows an awareness that his audience is one of male Roman aristocrats for whom anger was largely a part of everyday routine.

== Later history ==
The work survives due to being a part of the Codex Ambrosianus (no. 90) manuscript which dates from the 11th century.
