= Hisdosus =

Hisdosus (fl. c. 1100), also known as Hisdosus Scholasticus, was a writer and scholar who lived in the early 12th century. Nothing is known about his life. His first name is unknown, but he states that "I call myself Hisdosus, taken from the name of my father."

== History ==
A Latin commentary by him on Calcidius' translation of Plato's Timaeus survives in manuscript. He comments on the passage in the Timaeus (34b–36d) that deals with the World Soul. The commentary depends on the glosses by the French scholastic philosopher William of Conches on the Timaeus, and it has been supposed that he may have been a pupil of William of Conches.

Hisdosus' commentary is the only source (albeit in Latin paraphrase) for Heraclitus' comparison of the soul to a spider and the body to the spider's web (DK 22B 67a).
