= Robert W. Doty =

American neuroscientist

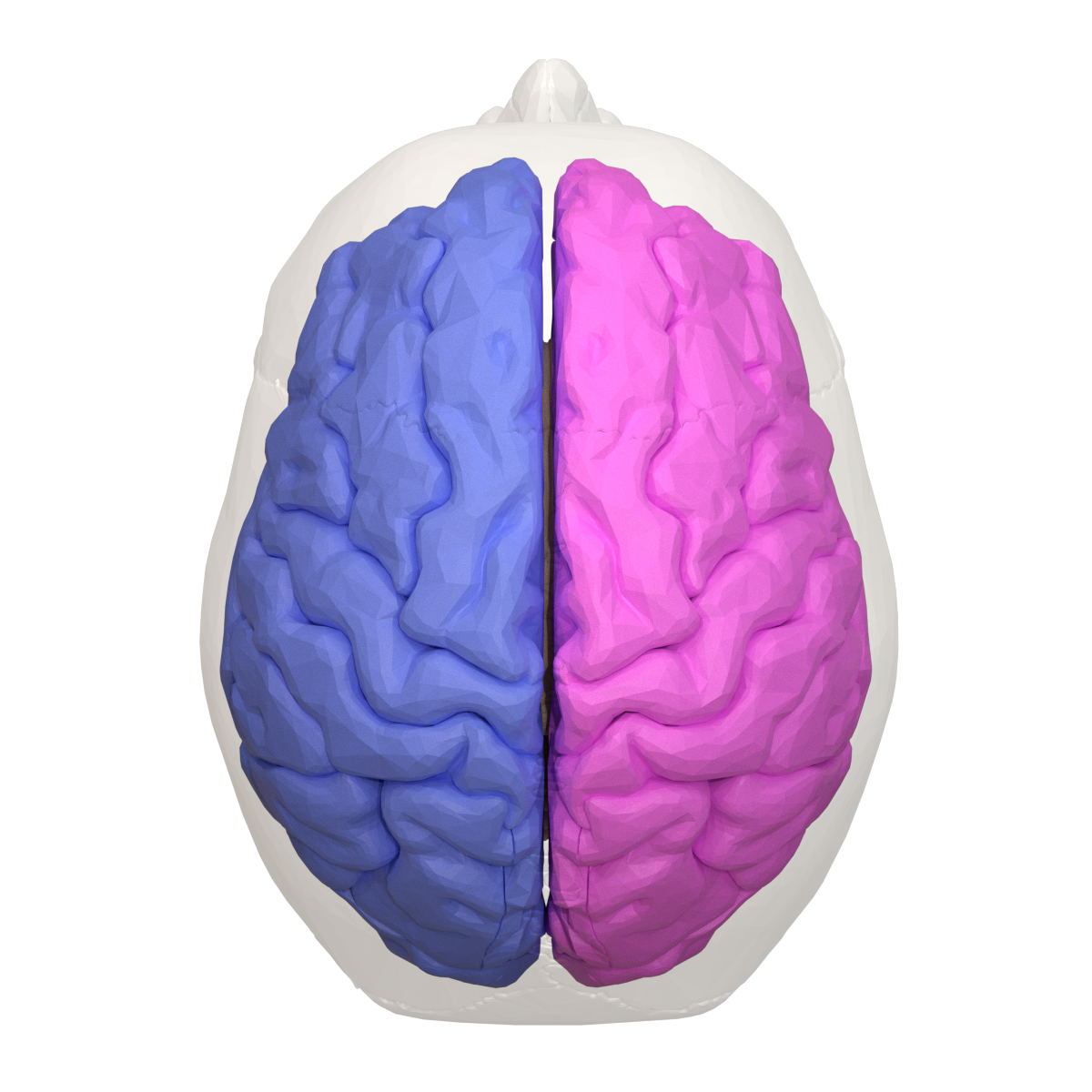
An image showing the left and right hemispheres of the brain. Doty's research contributed to the understanding of hemispheric functions.

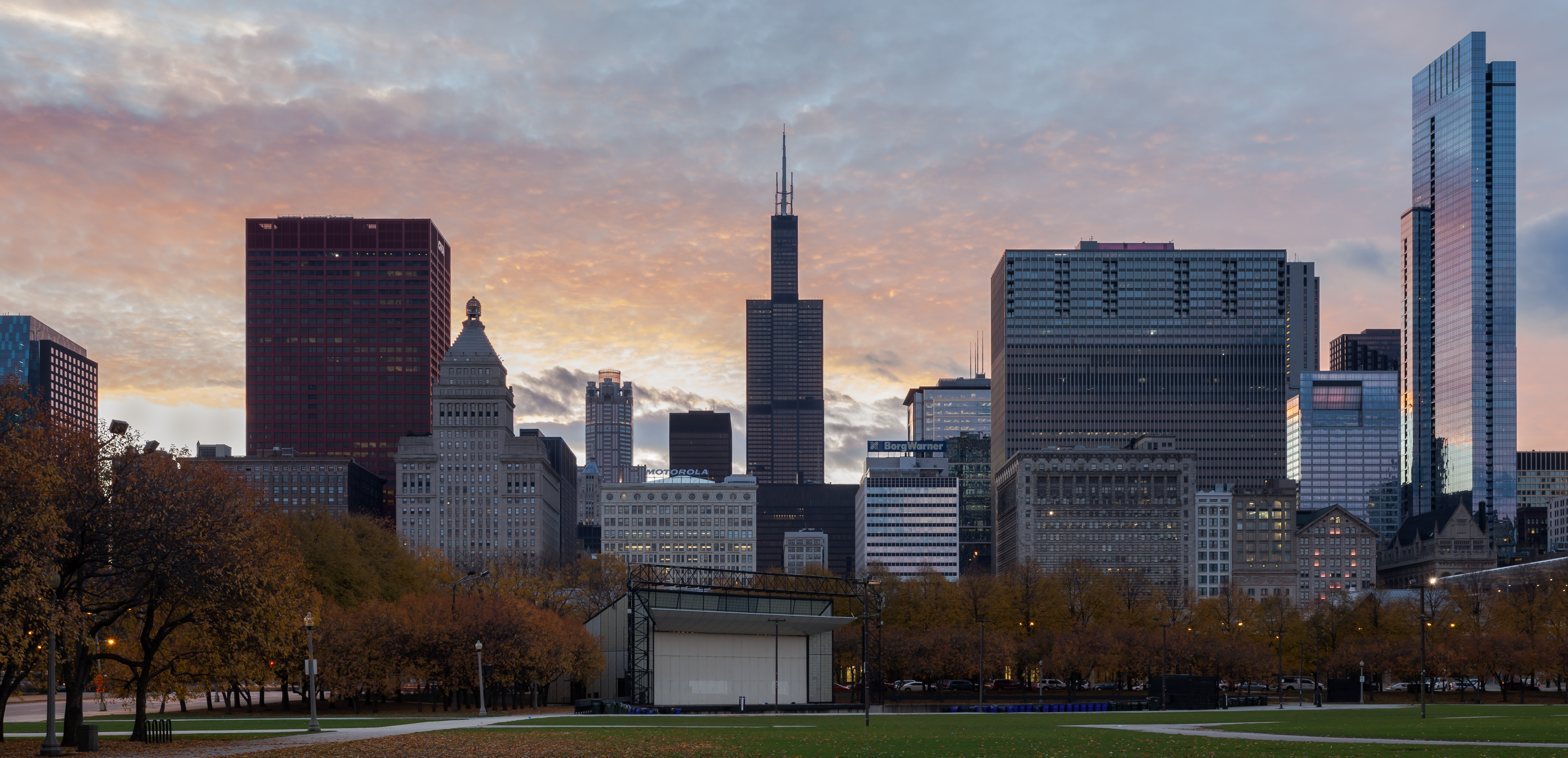
Chicago, Illinois, where Doty spent much of his early life.

Robert W. Doty (January 10, 1920 – January 14, 2011) was an American neuroscientist who contributed to the understanding of the separate functions of the cerebral hemispheres, discovered light sensitive luxotonic cells, and helped to found the Society for Neuroscience, serving as its president from 1975 to 1976.

== Early life ==
Robert W. Doty was born in New Rochelle, New York on January 10, 1920. He grew up in Illinois and graduated from Austin High School in Chicago in February 1937 with a diploma in history. He met his wife Elizabeth Natalie Jusewich while attending night school, and they married on August 30, 1941.

Doty was drafted into the army during World War II. He graduated from Officer Candidate School on April 2, 1943, and was then transferred into the Transportation Corps. He was relieved of active duty on August 9, 1946, and moved to Chicago with his wife . He was accepted as an undergraduate at the University of Chicago, beginning his studies as a junior. Here, he earned his Bachelors of Science, his Masters of Science, and a PhD all in Physiology . Despite being accepted into the University of Chicago's Medical School at o, he decided to remain in neuroscience research.

== Career and Research ==
Doty began his research at the University of Utah following his graduation from Chicago, publishing his first paper in 1950. He worked there until 1955, when he moved to the University of Michigan, and then moved from Michigan to the University of Rochester in 1961, where he would remain for the rest of his career. At Rochester, he founded a Center for Brain Research and later a Center for Visual Science. He published at least 87 papers throughout his career, including many after his semi-retirement in 1996, often using his own savings to continue running his lab.

Doty helped found the Society for Neuroscience in 1969, and was president of the society from 1975 to 1976

Doty's most well known research contributed to the understanding of the separate but coordinated functions of the left and right hemispheres of the brain. His discovery of cells in the brain with very high sensitivity to the intensity of light, luxotonic cells, now known to be linked to the dilation of the pupils, maintenance of the body's circadian rhythm, as well as the effects of stimulating the hippocampus and the amygdala on memory. His work established the basis for our understanding of cross hemisphere memory encoding and recall.

Other research he conducted includes investigation into the structure and response to stimuli in the striate cortex of macaque monkeys, and a variety of behavioral experiments using electrical stimulation of areas in the brains of cats.

Doty was known for his appreciation of early Neuro-biologists, having published papers on the significance of the contributions to neuroscience made by Alcmaeon of Croton, an ancient Greek philosopher, and Jerzy Konorski, a polish neuroscientist who continued research started by Ivan Pavlov.

== Death ==
On January 14, 2011, Robert W. Doty, age 91, died at his home in Rush, New York.
