= César Julien Jean Legallois =

- Born: 1 February 1770; Cherrueix, Bretagne, France
- Died: 10 February 1814 (aged 44); Paris, France
- Other name: Julien Jean César Legallois
- Occupations: Physician and physiologist
- Years active: 1801–1814
- Known for: Locating respiratory control center in medulla oblongata; Identifying metameric organization of spinal cord

César Julien Jean (also "Julien Jean César) Legallois" (also Le Gallois;) (1 February 1770 – 10 February 1814) was a French physician and physiologist.

== Life ==
César Julien Jean Legallois was the son of the Breton farmer César Legallois (circa 1743–1784) and his wife Julienne Anne Thérèse Bouassier (1739-1771). His mother died early, his father gave him a good education. When his father died, Legallois was thirteen and a student at Collège de Dol. Through a modest inheritance, he was able to continue his education. His interests were quite diverse, so he won the first prize in rhetoric at the Collège of Dol.

After the popular uprising of 2 June 1793 and the Reign of Terror he was a supporter of the Fédéralistes. These sympathies threatened his life at times.

Legallois began his medical studies in Caen and continued in Paris. His career, however, was interrupted more than once by illness. He graduated in medicine in 1801 at the École de Médecine de Paris.

While preparing for his dissertation, he recognized the importance of experimental research. For this reason, he devoted himself later to physiological research. The subject of his dissertation was Le sang est-il identique dans tous les vaiseaux qu'il parcourt? (which translates to: "Is blood the same in all the vessels it moves through?") presented at the Ecole de Médecine de Paris. For about ten years he served as a doctor for the poor in the 12th arrondissement of Paris. In addition to medicine, he studied several languages: Greek, Italian and English. Even before his doctorate, Legallois gained experience in practical medicine, for example through his work in various hospitals. In 1813, Legallois became the director of the Bicêtre hospital, chef de l'hospice and the prison of Bicêtre.

His only son, Eugène Legallois (about 1805–1831), was also a doctor. He died in 1831, returning from Poland, as a result of a cholera epidemic.

== Scientific achievements ==
He began a long series of physiological experiments to study the basic physical conditions necessary for the maintenance of life functions throughout the organism.

Legallois conducted a series of animal experiments to clarify the mechanism of respiration. By decapitation of vertebrates or other targeted destruction of neural connections in the brain and spinal cord, he came to the conclusion that respiration is controlled by a respiratory center located in the medulla oblongata. His discovery was that a lesion, on a small circumscribed area in the medulla, inhibits breathing (1811). This was the first attempt to localize respiratory regulation and was later completed by the work of Marie-Jean-Pierre Flourens (1794–1867).

One of his most important discoveries was the demonstration of metameric organization of the spinal cord, from which each segment as a neural center of a particular region (e.g. As dermatome, Myotom) serves to coordinate about their sensory and motor activity.

The idea of an extracorporeal circulation was introduced by him in his 1812 monograph Expériences sur le principe de la vie, notamment sur celui des mouvemens du cœur, et sur le siège de ce principe.

"(...) But if one could replace the heart with some form of injection and at the same time continuously provide natural or artificially produced arterial blood for this injection – provided that such an artificial production is possible – life would succeed effortlessly maintaining each part of the body for an indefinite period of time: consequently, after decapitation, one could maintain all brain functions in the mind itself. In this way, one could not only maintain life in the head or in any other part isolated from the body of the animal but also recall it thereafter its complete extinction. One could also call it back into the whole body and thus accomplish its true resurrection in the truest sense of the word. (...)"

== Works ==
- Le sang est-il identique dans tous les vaisseaux qu’il parcourt? Chez l’auteur, de l’Imprimerie de Lesguilliez Freres, Paris an X (1801).
- Recherches chronologiques sur l’Hippocrate. Paris 1804.
- Expériences sur le principe de la vie, notamment sur celui des mouvemens du cœur, et sur le siège de ce principe. Chez D’Hautel, Paris 1812 (César Julien Jean Legallois at the Internet Archive); engl. Übersetzung: Thomas, Philadelphia 1813 (Digitalisat).
- Oeuvres de César Legallois, médecin en chef de l'hospice et de la prison de Bicêtre. Le Rouge, 1830.
- Fragments d’um mémoire sur le temps durant lequel les jeunes animaux peuvent être, sans danger, privés de la respiration. Paris 1834 (posthum).

== Literature ==
- Cheung, Tobias (Summer 2013). "Limits of Life and Death: Legallois's Decapitation Experiments". Journal of the History of Biology. 46 (2): 283–313. doi:10.1007/s10739-012-9335-7. PMID 22895659. S2CID 254547388.
- Fye, W. Bruce (October 1995). "Julien Jean César Legallois". Clinical Cardiology. 18 (10): 599–600. doi:10.1002/clc.4960181015. PMID 8785909. S2CID 221579850.
