= Institute of Higher Nervous Activity and Neurophysiology =

Russian research institute

- Other name: Институт высшей нервной деятельности и нейрофизиологии РАН
- Founder: Esras Asratyan
- Established: 1950
- Address: 5A Butlerova St., Moscow 117485
- Location: Russia, Moscow
- Website: Official website

The Institute of Higher Nervous Activity and Neurophysiology is a research institute located in Moscow, Russia that specializes in neuroscience, and is a part of the Russian Academy of Sciences.

== Leading scientists of the institute ==
- 1950-1952 - Esras Asratyan, Corresponding Member of the Academy of Sciences of the USSR
- 1952-1957 - Anatoly Ivanov-Smolensky, Academician of the USSR Academy of Medical Sciences
- 1957-1960 - Leonid Voronin, Corresponding Member of the Academy of Sciences of the USSR
- 1960-1981 - Esras Asratyan, Corresponding Member of the USSR Academy of Sciences
- 1981-2000 - Pavel Simonov, Academician of the Russian Academy of Sciences
- 2000-2005 - Igor Shevelyov, Academician of the Russian Academy of Sciences
- 2005-2018 - Pavel Balaban, Corresponding Member of the Russian Academy of Sciences
- 2018-Present - A. Malyshev, Professor of the Russian Academy of Sciences
