= Apatheia =

Stoic concept of being undisturbed by passions

In Stoic philosophy, apatheia (Ancient Greek: ἀπάθεια; from a- 'without' and pathos 'suffering, passion') refers to a state of mind in which one is not disturbed by the passions. It might better be translated by the word equanimity than the word indifference. The meaning of the word apatheia is quite different from that of the modern English apathy, which has a distinctly negative connotation that includes feelings of inertness, indifference, and impassiveness. According to the Stoics, apatheia was the quality that characterized the sage.

== Philosophy ==
Whereas Aristotle had claimed that virtue was to be found in the golden mean between an excess and a deficiency of emotion (metriopatheia), the Stoics thought that living virtuously provided freedom from the passions, resulting in apatheia. It meant eradicating the tendency to react emotionally or egotistically to external events, the things that cannot be controlled. For Stoics, it was the optimally rational response to the world, for things cannot be controlled if they are caused by the will of others or by Nature; only one's own will can be controlled. That did not mean a loss of feeling, or total disengagement from the world. The Stoic who performs correct (virtuous) judgments and actions as part of the world order experiences contentment (eudaimonia) and good feelings (eupatheia).

Pain is slight if opinion has added nothing to it;... in thinking it slight, you will make it slight. Everything depends on opinion; ambition, luxury, greed, hark back to opinion. It is according to opinion that we suffer.... So let us also win the way to victory in all our struggles, – for the reward is... virtue, steadfastness of soul, and a peace that is won for all time.

— Seneca, Epistles, lxxviii. 13–16

== Rivals of Apatheia ==
Followers of Epicurus were the main opponents of Stoicism and apatheia. Instead of apatheia, they believed in a similar form of living which is ataraxia, a related concept in Epicureanism. Some Latin Stoic authors, such as Seneca used the term interchangeably with apatheia. In Epicureanism, ataraxia comes from freedom from pain and fear and results in a life full of tranquility, imperturbability, and without trouble. The main difference between these terms is how it is achieved. Apatheia was seen as a byproduct of living a virtuous life and was not a goal for Stoics to directly attempt to achieve. For followers of Epicurus, ataraxia was a goal that could be achieved through the avoidance of pain which comes primarily from social and political life.

== Religion ==
The term was later adopted by Plotinus in his development of Neoplatonism, in which apatheia was the soul's freedom from emotion achieved when it reaches its purified state. It passed into early Christian teaching in which apatheia meant freedom from unruly urges or compulsions and instead replace them with new and better energy. This practice often times leads to asceticism. Apatheia and asceticism are often times connected to each other. It is believed that apatheia is the precondition for beginning the pursuit of an intimate and direct knowledge of God that initiates us into sanctity while asceticism is the direct seeking of this knowledge. Apatheia has been used to describe God in as early as the 1st century by Ignatius of Antioch. It is still used in that sense in Orthodox Christian spirituality, and especially in monastic practice.

Apatheia has many different interpretations and uses in the religious world that cause for debate over which viewpoint is the best one. Evagrius Ponticus believed there to be eight passions that the soul must be free of which include lust, gluttony, pride, envy, greed, boredom, anger, and self-love. These passions were described to be unnatural movements of the souls. Apatheia would be used to help reach the point where the mind is independent of the bodily senses. Maximus the Confessor believed in the same eight unnatural passions but he instead uses apatheia to transform the passions into agape, or non-egoistic love.

== See also ==
- Hesychia, or stillness
- Upekkha, a related concept described in Buddhism
- Vairagya, a related concept in Hindu philosophy
