= On the Sacred Disease =

Book in the Hippocratic corpus

- Author: Hippocrates (putative)
- Genre: Medical literature
- Text: On the Sacred Disease at Wikisource

On the Sacred Disease is a work of the Hippocratic Corpus, written about 400 B.C. Its authorship is attributed to Hippocrates. The treatise is thought to contain one of the first recorded observations of epilepsy in humans. The author explains these phenomena by the flux of the phlegm flowing from the brain into the veins rather than assigning them a divine origin. This turn from a supernatural to a naturalistic explanation is considered a major breakthrough in the history of medicine.

== Summary ==
"I am about to discuss the disease called 'sacred.' It is not, in my opinion, any more divine or more sacred than other diseases, but has a natural cause, and its supposed divine origin is due to men's inexperience and to their wonder at its peculiar character."

The author, putatively Hippocrates, comments on the "sacred" disease, declaring that it is no more sacred than other diseases. He stresses the importance of the disease having no relation with the divine whatsoever, but instead being purely of human origin. The author of On the Sacred Disease argues that even the most mysterious of diseases was still of natural cause and not of divine origin:

Men regard its nature and cause as divine from ignorance and wonder because it is not at all like to other diseases…Men being in want of the means of life, invent many and various things, and devise many contrivances for all other things and for this disease, in every phase of the disease, assigning the cause to a god... Neither truly do I count it a worth opinion to hold that the body of man is polluted by god, the most impure by the most holy,

Symptoms of this disease are described as men becoming mad either by crying out, suffocating on saliva, frothing at the mouth, or by shaking uncontrollably. Such symptoms were thought to be a punishment from the gods on an individual. Hippocrates continues his argument by noting that such phenomena are not of divine origin because previous treatments to the affected involved incantations and prayer patterns that were unsuccessful.

The text continues with the known anatomy of the brain at the time. The brain of a human is similar to other animals in that it is double and divided by a thin membrane through the middle. Hippocrates attributes this fact as the reason that a patient's pain is not always located in the same spot on his or her head. Veins from the body's major organs connect to the brain and vary in size. The veins that run along the right region of the body through the heart and lungs are continued to be described to the best of Hippocrates' knowledge:

The other runs upward by the right veins in the lungs and divides into branches for the heart and the right arm. The remaining part of it rises across the clavicle to the right side of the neck, and is superficial so as to be seen; near the ear it is concealed, and there it divides; its thickest, largest, and most hollow part ends in the brain; another small vein goes to the right ear, another to the right eye, and another to the nostril. Such are the distributions of the hepatic vein.

Hippocrates argues that the start of this sacred disease begins with the accumulation of phlegm (one of the "four humors") in the veins of the head. The author points to dissection of epileptic cattle as evidence that phlegm builds up in the brain. This build-up begins to be formed in utero. If this disease continues to grow after birth and into adulthood, the affected person will have a "melted" brain which results in mental illness. Once the disease is stuck within the head, the patient loses his speech and chokes, causing foam to fall from his or her mouth.

Young children who obtain the disease mostly die; Hippocrates argues that due to their small veins, they are not able to accommodate the increased amount of phlegm. When the phlegm gathers, the child quickly "cools" and the blood congeals, causing death.

The elderly for the most part survive the disease due to the Hippocratic theory that their veins are larger and filled with hot, flowing blood that is safe from the coldness of the phlegm.

Summary of symptoms

- Shivering
- Loss of speech
- Trouble breathing
- Contraction of the brain
- Blood stops circulating
- Excretion of the phlegm

Many of those affected seem to know when they are about to have another episode. When this happens, they become ashamed and flee from the surrounding crowd to hide. Hippocrates mentions that this is due to their shame around the disease, rather than fear of the divine as was the common opinion.

Hippocrates concludes that the sacred disease is proof that the brain has the greatest power over man - a foundational statement of the cephalocentric hypothesis in Greek medicine. Through this part of the body, air from breathing first enters. When the disease dilutes the mind to the point where phlegm in the veins increases sufficiently, causing air blockage, is when the patient begins to suffer and possibly die.

== See also ==
- Cephalocentric hypothesis
