= Passions (philosophy) =

Philosophical concept

In philosophy and religion, the passions are understood to be the emotions, instincts and desires that drive a human being (including lust, anger, aggression, jealousy, etc.). Different philosophical traditions hold different views about the passions. The philosophical notion of passion, in contrast, is generally identified with instinctually driven emotional states, in many ancient philosophies and religious doctrines, the passions are the basis for deadly sins and seen as leading to various social and spiritual ills. In Western philosophical traditions, the passions are often placed in opposition to reason.

Some seventeenth-century philosophers worked within an intellectual milieu in which the passions were regarded as a potent element of human nature, capable of disrupting any civilized order, including philosophy, unless they were tamed, outwitted, overruled, or seduced. Natural philosophy deals with the actions and operations of passions, and the task of moral philosophy is to explore whether and how the passions can (or should) be bridled, and how their indifference is transformed into good or evil by virtue of the domination of right reason. Reason is advocated in the control of passion, something seen as desirable and necessary for the development of a mature, civilized human being. This is achieved by the cultivation of virtue. Four virtues in particular have long been seen as of special value in this area of philosophy.

The majority of philosophies and religions advocate at the very least tempering the passions to keep them within acceptable bounds. However, most of the religions recommend both the restraint and the transformation of the passions to the point where they no longer arise. Including Christianity, Jainism, Buddhism, Islam and Hinduism. The institution of the monastery within various religions is a means by which human beings may temporarily or permanently seclude themselves from circumstances exacerbating the arising of passion and provide a supportive environment for doing spiritual work.

Contemporary philosopher Roberto Mangabeira Unger has developed a view of the passions that disassociates them from human nature, and instead gives them a formless life that serve non-instrumental dealings with each other. Rather than the guiding force behind our relations with the world, they organize and are organized around the need and danger that is at the heart of our relations with each other. In this way, Unger rejects the traditional view of the passions as something counter to reason and which are associated with certain expressions; rather, he sees them at the service of reason and their expression formed within certain contexts.

== Background ==
The subject of the passions has long been a consideration in Western philosophy. According to European philosopher Michel Meyer, they have aroused harsh judgments as the representation of a force of excess and lawlessness in humanity that produces troubling, confusing paradoxes. Meyer sees philosophers as having treated the passions as a given expression of human nature, leaving the question of whether the passions "torture people because it blinds them, or, on the contrary, does it permit them to apprehend who and what we really are?"

== Spinoza ==
The seventeenth century Dutch philosopher Spinoza contrasted "action" with "passion," as well as the state of being "active" with the state of being "passive." A passion, in his view, happens when external events affect us partially such that we have confused ideas about these events and their causes. A "passive" state is when we experience an emotion which Spinoza regarded as a "passivity of the soul." The body's power is increased or diminished. Emotions are bodily changes plus ideas about these changes which can help or hurt a human. It happens when the bodily changes we experience are caused primarily by external forces or by a mix of external and internal forces. Spinoza argued that it was much better for the individual himself to be the only adequate cause of bodily changes, and to act based on an adequate understanding of causes-and-effects with ideas of these changes logically related to each other and to reality. When this happens, the person is "active," and Spinoza described the ideas as adequate. But most of the time, this does not happen, and Spinoza saw emotions as more powerful than reason. Spinoza tried to live the life of reason which he advocated.

== See also ==
- Affect
- Passion: An Essay on Personality
- Philosophy of desire
- Baruch Spinoza
- Passion (emotion)
- Philosophy of Spinoza
- René Descartes's Passions of the Soul
- Stoic passions
