= Calcidius =

4th-century philosopher

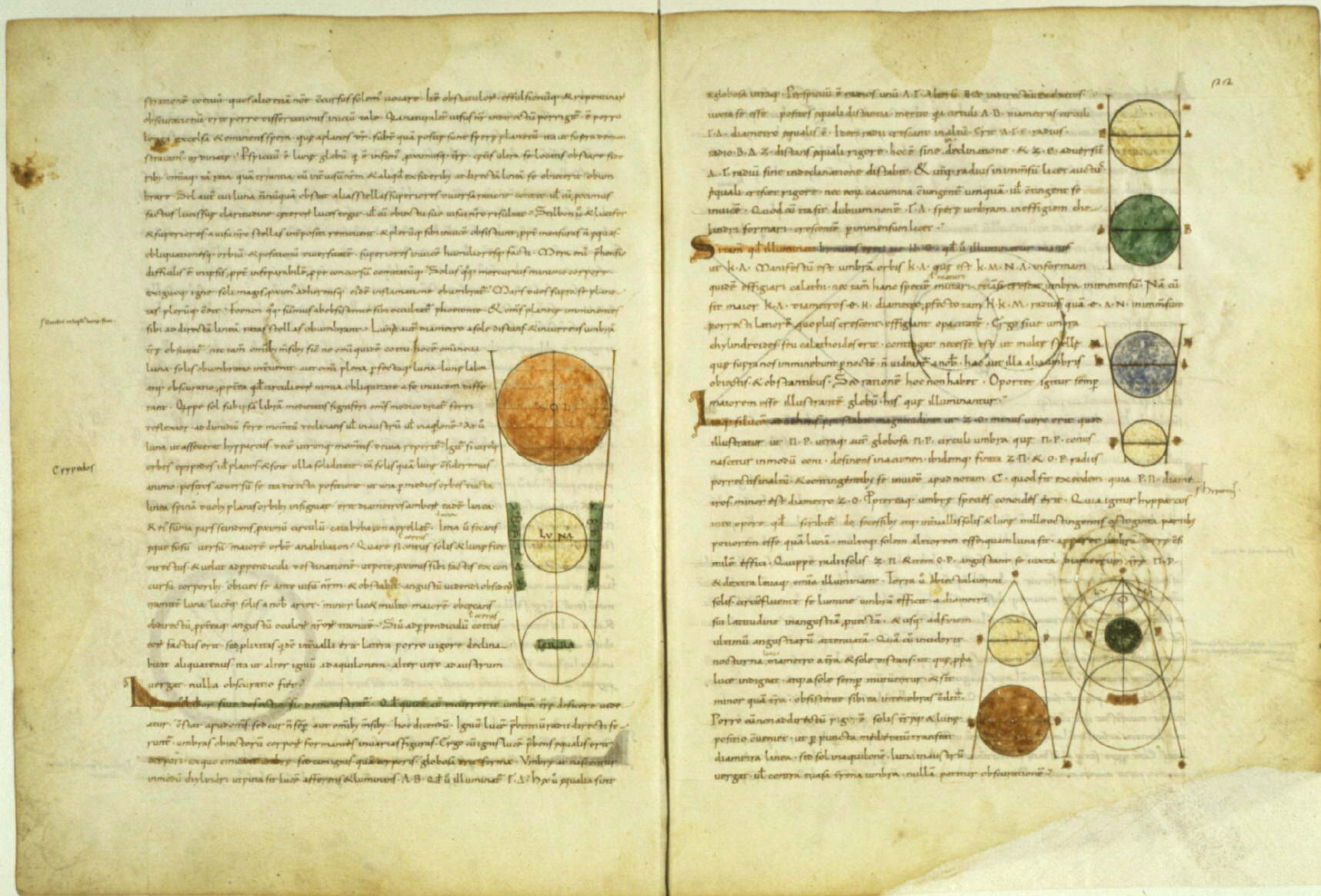
Tenth-century manuscript of Calcidius' Timaeus translation and commentary now in the Vatican Library.

Calcidius (or Chalcidius) was a 4th-century philosopher who translated the first part (to 53c) of Plato's Timaeus from Greek into Latin around the year 321 and provided with it an extensive commentary. This was likely done for Bishop Hosius of Córdoba. Very little is otherwise known of him.

His translation of the Timaeus was the only extensive text of Plato known to scholars in the Latin West for approximately 800 years. His commentary also contained useful accounts of Greek astronomical knowledge. In the 12th century commentaries on this work were written by Christian scholars including Hisdosus and philosophers of the Chartres School, such as Thierry of Chartres and William of Conches. Interpreting it in the light of the Christian faith, the academics in the School of Chartres understood the dialogue to refer to creatio ex nihilo.

== Calcidius' life and philosophical sources ==
There is almost no direct evidence of Calcidius' biographical details, and we have only his translation and commentary of Plato's Timaeus as evidence for his philosophical views. Calcidius' name appears to have been Greek in origin and some linguistic evidence in his translations suggest Calcidius might have been predominantly a Greek-speaker rather than a native Latin one. He certainly paraphrases or directly quotes from a range of Greek sources, including Homer, Hesiod, and Euripides, in addition to Latin ones such as Terence and Virgil, suggesting a bilingual education. However, there is ultimately not enough evidence to locate a geographic origin for Calcidius. His name had been associated with Chalcis in Euboea but this information is thought to be unreliable since there were several ancient cities called Chalcis.

Calcidius’ commentaries suggest some influence of Middle Platonism, and some scholars also detect influence from Porphyry although others downplay his influence on Calcidius. Multiple features of his commentary have been traced to Theon of Smyrna, Alcinous’ Didaskalikos, works attributed to the Pseudo-Plutarch, Philo of Alexandria, Origen, as well as the Neopythagorean Numenius. In general however, these influences only suggest that Calcidius relied on various Middle Platonic sources to interpret Plato's dialogue and do not conclusively demonstrate Calcidius' own philosophical leanings.

Calcidius appears to have expressed no bias towards Christianity in his works on Plato, and neither does he express any hostility towards Christian dogma generally. In his commentaries, Calcidius makes no explicit link between the Christian creation narrative found in Genesis and the Platonic one in the Timaeus dialogue.

== Translation of the Timaeus ==
Calcidius' translation of Plato's original Greek dialogue covers the sections 17a – 53c, i.e. from the Introduction where Critias discusses the story of Solon's journey to Egypt where he hears the tale of Atlantis, up to the discussion of the 'Receptacle' and the Divine Creator's use of four of the five regular solids (fire, earth, air and water) in the shaping of the Universe. The date of the work appears to be around the first half of the 4th century A.D.

The impetus for producing the translation and commentary could have arisen from an invitation by Osius (or Hosius), Bishop of Cordoba, who participated in the ecumenical councils of Nicea and Serdica in 325 and 343 A.D. Calcidius' opening dedicatory epistle seems to be addressed to an 'Osius' although there are at least five different historical figures to whom this name could be ascribed.

The translation itself is generally literal with some stylistic additions on Calcidius' part. The influence of Calcidius’ translation on the Middle Ages was immense, perhaps more significant than even Cicero's version (composed c. 45 B.C.) However, scholars are not in agreement as to whether Calcidius relied on Cicero's translation for his own and the current opinion seems to be that there are no substantial parallels with Cicero's translation in Calcidius’ work. Others doubt this claim, as in Ratkowitsch, who argues that not just single lexical items but also entire clauses from Cicero's version are echoed in Calcidius' translation. Several of Calcidius' commentaries were characterized as repetition or abbreviation of passages of his translations. His commentaries also provided information as to his interpretation of the structure or order of Timaeus. The first approach was a list of twenty-seven subject matters addressed in the dialogue while the second order treats cited thirteen chapters out of the previously cited twenty seven subjects.

Calcidius’ options when it came to expressing a Greek term from Plato's original for which Latin had no equivalent included: transliteration of the term without an explanation (e.g. noys for νοῦς), deployment of some neologism coined in Cicero's earlier version (e.g. medietas for μεσότης), or lexical innovation where he coins his own term as the most suitable equivalent in Latin (e.g. adunatio for συναρμόττον).

=== Manuscript tradition ===
The first extant manuscripts of both Cicero's and Calcidius' Latin versions of the Timaeus, as well as the original Greek version (Paris BNF MS grec. 1807), can be dated to the 9th century A.D. The relevant manuscripts of Calcidius' translation and commentary are the Valenciennes, Bibl. municipale MS 293; Lyons, Bibl. municipale MS 324; and Vatican City, BAV MS Reg. Lat. 1068 (which contains only the dialogue and no commentary). There are only two extant manuscripts preserved from the 10th century A.D.: the Paris, BnF MS lat. 2164 and the Brussels, BR MS 9625–9626. From the 11th century A.D. onwards, a significant increase in the production of manuscripts containing Calcidius' translation and commentary began to appear in Europe with 17 versions appearing in the 11th century, 5 in the 12th century, 3 in the 13th century, 2 in the 14th century and 11 in the 15th century. Many of these manuscripts contained glosses by various medieval scribes and annotators to clarify and expand upon the concepts discussed in Calcidius' work.
