= Stoic passions =

Various forms of emotional suffering in Stoicism

Stoic passions are various forms of emotional suffering in Stoicism, a school of Hellenistic philosophy.

== Definition ==
The passions are transliterated pathê from Greek. The Greek word pathos was a wide-ranging term indicating an infliction one suffers. The Stoics used the word to discuss many common emotions such as anger, fear and excessive joy. A passion is a disturbing and misleading force in the mind which occurs because of a failure to reason correctly. For the Stoic Chrysippus the passions are evaluative judgements. A person experiencing such an emotion has incorrectly valued an indifferent thing. A fault of judgement, some false notion of good or evil, lies at the root of each passion. Incorrect judgement as to a present good gives rise to delight, while lust is a wrong estimate about the future. Unreal imaginings of evil cause distress about the present, or fear for the future.

These states of feeling are disturbances of mental health which upset the natural balance of the soul, and destroy its self-control. They are harmful because they conflict with right reason. The ideal Stoic would instead measure things at their real value, and see that the passions are not natural. To be free of the passions is to have a happiness which is self-contained. There would be nothing to fear—for unreason is the only evil; no cause for anger—for others cannot harm you.

== Primary passions ==
The Stoics beginning with Zeno arranged the passions under four headings: distress, pleasure, fear and lust. One report of the Stoic definitions of these passions appears in the treatise On Passions by Pseudo-Andronicus (trans. Long & Sedley, pg. 411, modified):

Distress (lupē)
Distress is an irrational contraction, or a fresh opinion that something bad is present, at which people think it right to be depressed.
Fear (phobos)
Fear is an irrational aversion, or avoidance of an expected danger.
Lust (epithumia)
Lust is an irrational desire, or pursuit of an expected good but in reality bad.
Delight (hēdonē)
Delight is an irrational swelling, or a fresh opinion that something good is present, at which people think it is right to be elated.

Two of these passions (distress and delight) refer to emotions currently present, and two of these (fear and lust) refer to emotions directed at the future. Thus there are just two states directed at the prospect of good and evil, but subdivided as to whether they are present or future:

	Present	Future
Good	Delight	Lust
Evil	Distress	Fear

== Subdivisions ==
Numerous subdivisions of the same class are brought under the head of the separate passions. The definitions are those of the translation of Cicero's Tusculan Disputations by J. E. King.

=== Distress ===
Envy
Envy is distress incurred by reason of a neighbor's prosperity.
Rivalry
Rivalry is distress, should another be in possession of the object desired and one has to go without it oneself.
Jealousy
Jealousy is distress arising from the fact that the thing one has coveted oneself is in the possession of the other man as well as one's own.
Compassion
Compassion is distress arising from the wretchedness of a neighbor in undeserved suffering.
Anxiety
Anxiety is oppressive distress.
Mourning
Mourning is distress arising from the untimely death of a beloved object.
Sadness
Sadness is tearful distress.
Troubling
Troubling is burdensome distress.
Grief
Grief is torturing distress.
Lamenting
Distress accompanied by wailing.
Depression
Depression is distress accompanied by brooding.
Vexation
Vexation is lasting distress.
Despondency
Despondency is distress without any prospect of amelioration.

=== Fear ===
Sluggishness
Sluggishness is fear of ensuing toil.
Shame
Shame is fear of disgrace.
Fright
Fright is paralyzing fear which causes paleness, trembling and chattering of teeth.
Timidity
Timidity is fear of approaching evil.
Consternation
Consternation is fear upsetting the mental balance.
Pusillanimity
Pusillanimity is fear following on the heels of fright like an attendant.
Bewilderment
Bewilderment is fear paralyzing thought.
Faintheartedness
Faintheartedness is lasting fear.

=== Lust ===
Anger
Anger is lust of punishing the man who is thought to have inflicted an undeserved injury.
Rage
Rage is anger springing up and suddenly showing itself.
Hatred
Hatred is inveterate anger.
Enmity
Enmity is anger watching as opportunity for revenge.
Wrath
Wrath is anger of greater bitterness conceived in the innermost heart and soul.
Greed
Greed is insatiable lust.
Longing
Longing is lust of beholding someone who is not present.

=== Delight ===
Malice
Malice is pleasure derived from a neighbor's evil which brings no advantage to oneself.
Rapture
Rapture is pleasure soothing the soul by charm of the sense of hearing.
Ostentation
Ostentation is pleasure shown in outward demeanor and puffing oneself out extravagantly.

== Good feelings ==
The wise person (sophos) is someone who is free from the passions (apatheia). Instead of passion, the sage experiences good-feelings (eupatheia) which are clear-headed. These emotional impulses are not excessive, but nor are they diminished emotions. Instead they are the correct rational emotions. The Stoics listed the good-feelings under the headings of joy (chara), wish (boulesis), and caution (eulabeia). Thus if something is present which is a genuine good, then the wise person experiences an uplift in the soul—joy (chara). The Stoics also subdivided the good-feelings:

- Joy:
  - Enjoyment
  - Cheerfulness
  - Good spirits
- Wish:
  - Good intent
  - Goodwill
  - Welcoming
  - Cherishing
  - Love
- Caution:
  - Moral shame
  - Reverence

== See also ==
- Appetites of the soul
- On Passions
- Passions
