= Alcmaeon of Croton =

5th-century BC Greek physician and philosopher

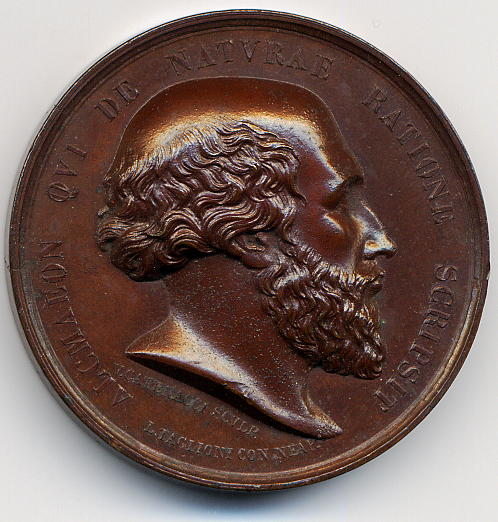
- Fictionalized 1832 Bronze medal devoted to Alcmaeon of Croton

Philosophical work
- Era: Pre-Socratic philosophy
- Region: Western philosophy
- School: Pythagoreanism
- Main interests: Natural philosophy
- Notable ideas: Humorism

Alcmaeon of Croton (/ælkˈmiːɒn/; Greek: Ἀλκμαίων ὁ Κροτωνιάτης, Alkmaiōn, gen.: Ἀλκμαίωνος; fl. 5th century BC) was an early Greek medical writer and philosopher-scientist. He has been described as one of the most eminent natural philosophers and medical theorists of antiquity and he has also been referred to as "a thinker of considerable originality and one of the greatest philosophers, naturalists, and neuroscientists of all time." His work in biology has been described as remarkable, and his originality likely made him a pioneer. Because of difficulties dating Alcmaeon's birth, his importance has been neglected.

== Biography ==
Alcmaeon was born in Croton, Magna Graecia, and was the son of Peirithous. Alcmaeon is said by some to have been a pupil of Pythagoras, and he is believed to have been born c. 510 BC. Although he wrote primarily about medical topics, there is some suggestion that he was a philosopher of science, not a physician. He also practiced astrology and meteorology. Nothing more is known of the events of his life.

== Work ==
During Alcmaeon's time, the medical school in Magna Graecia was regarded as the most famous; illnesses were studied in a scientific and experimental manner. Alcmaeon was considered by many an early pioneer and advocate of anatomical dissection and was said to be the first to identify Eustachian tubes. His celebrated discoveries in the field of dissection were noted in antiquity, but whether his knowledge in this branch of science was derived from the dissection of animals or of human bodies is disputed. Calcidius, on whose authority the fact rests, merely says "qui primus exsectionem aggredi est ausus," and the word exsectio would apply equally well in either case; some modern scholars doubt Calcidius' word entirely.

Alcmaeon also was the first to dwell on the internal causes of illnesses. It was he who first suggested that health was a state of equilibrium between opposing humors and that illnesses were because of problems in environment, nutrition and lifestyle. A book titled On Nature is attributed to him, though the original title may be different, as Alexandrian writers were known to have ascribed the title "On Nature" to a wide variety of works. According to Favorinus's account, Alcmaeon has been the first who wrote such a treatise on natural philosophy (φυσικὸν λόγον), however this has been disputed, because Anaximander wrote before Alcmaeon. Accounts which attribute an Alcmaeon of Croton to be the first to write animal fables, may be a reference to a poet with the same name. He also wrote several other medical and philosophical works, of which nothing but the titles and a few fragments have been preserved by Stobaeus, Plutarch, and Galen.

Surviving fragments attributed to Alcmaeon include, "The earth is the mother of plants and the sun their father", and maybe also, "Experience is the beginning of learning", attributed to a Spartan poet named Alcman.

The equality (isonomia) of the powers (wet, dry, cold, hot, bitter, sweet, etc.) maintains health but that monarchy among them produces disease.

=== Study of the senses ===
Theophrastus in his De Sensu offers a summary of the physiological science of Alcmaeon, where his positions regarding the ability to understand being what separates man from animals, the way in which each individual sense operates and the brain being the center of activity for thought and senses, are mentioned. Alcmaeon differed from his contemporaries in several ways. While Empedocles held that sensations resulted from interactions between likes with the residence of the mind being in the heart, Alcmaeon concluded that sensations were born out of interactions between unlikes and the seat of the mind was the head. He further disagreed with Empidocles regarding the identity between sensation and thought, and he drew a clear distinction between them. This served as a defining difference between animals who can only sense, and the superior man who can also think, a notion accepted and confirmed by Aristotle.

Calcidius' commentary on Plato's Timaeus praises Alcmaeon, Callisthenes, and Herophilus for their work on the nature of the eye. He mentions that Alcmaeon excised an animal eye to study the optic nerve. However, there is no evidence that Alcmaeon himself dissected the eye or the skull. Based on this observation, and more rudimentary, Alcmaeon described the senses, except for the touch sense. These observations contributed to the study of medicine by establishing the connection between the brain and the sense organs, and outlined the paths of the optic nerves as well as stating that the brain is the organ of the mind. Many scholars believe that Plato referred to Alcmaeon's work, when writing in Phaedo about the senses and how we or animals think. He also stated that the eye contains both fire and water, with vision occurring once something is seen and reflected by the gleaming and translucent part of the eye.

=== Other studies ===
Alcmaeon said that sleep occurs by the withdrawal of blood, away from the surface of the body, to larger blood-flowing vessels, and that one becomes awake again once the blood returns. And if the blood withdraws entirely, death occurs. It has been suggested that Hippocratic authors, and Aristotle, adopted Alcmaeon's views on sleep. There are also accounts of him about embryology, how a child develops, and analogies with animals and plants about human physiology.

Based on Theophrastus, Cicero and Clement refer to Alcmaeon as believing that the celestial bodies were divine, and Aetius presents the argument for the soul's immortality due to its continuous autonomous motion. These ideas in themselves were not innovative, for the notion of the eternal self-caused motion of nature served the arguments of Anaximenes and the Pythagorians and the divinity of heavenly bodies was well accepted in popular religion, but Alcmaeon was unique in that he presented them in a logical fashion. Both these ideas are related to the core image of circular motion, and especially the circular character of time, as were seen in the revolutions of the heavenly bodies as they are related to the circular repetitions of events on earth, such as the seasonal changes orchestrated by the sun. The notion of circularity was further applied to such varied areas as geometry, astronomy, chronology, history and physiology. It in this context that Alcmaeon is quoted as saying "that the reason why men die is they cannot join the beginning and the end". The soul, in its action on the body, imitates the eternal circular motions of the divine stars with life being dependent on the circular integration of all parts into one continuous whole.

Because of the little evidence, there exists controversy to what extent Alcmaeon can be considered as a Presocratic cosmologist, or if at all.

== Pythagorean ==
Although Alcmaeon is often described as a pupil of Pythagoras, there are reasons to doubt whether he was a Pythagorean at all; his name seems to have crept into lists of Pythagoreans given us by later writers. Aristotle mentions him as nearly contemporary with Pythagoras, but distinguishes between the stoicheia (στοιχεῖα) of opposites, under which the Pythagoreans included all things; and the double principle of Alcmaeon, according to Aristotle, less extended, although he does not explain the precise difference. Since 1950 the scholarly consensus holds that Alcmaeon of Croton is a figure independent of the Pythagoreans.

Other doctrines of Alcmaeon have been preserved. He said that the human soul was immortal and partook of the divine nature, because like the heavenly bodies it contained in itself a principle of motion. The eclipse of the moon, which was also eternal, he supposed to arise from its shape, which he said was like a boat. All his doctrines which have come down to us relate to physics or medicine; and seem to have arisen partly out of the speculations of the Ionian School, with which rather than the Pythagorean, Aristotle appears to connect Alcmaeon, partly from the traditional lore of the earliest medical science.

=== Modern influence ===
Alcmaeon of Croton, an ancient Greek philosopher, physician, and scientist who lived during the 5th century BCE, is widely regarded as one of the founders of the medical tradition in ancient Greece and made some significant contributions to the fields of anatomy and physiology and the overall field of medicine as well. Alcmaeon's work had a large impact on the development of Western medicine and science. His ideas continue to influence our understanding of the human body and mind today.

One of Alcmaeon's most significant contributions to medicine was his understanding of the brain and the role that it played in human physiology. He was one of the first people to recognize the importance of the brain as the point of intelligence and consciousness (or soul). Alcmaeon believed that the brain was the most important organ in the body and that it was responsible for controlling all of the body's functions. He also believed that the brain was the site of the senses and that different areas of the brain were responsible for detecting different sensory experiences.

Alcmaeon's work also had a significant impact on the study of anatomy. He was one of the first physicians to perform dissections on human cadavers, which allowed him to gain a better understanding of the structure and function of the human body and all of its parts. Alcmaeon was particularly interested in the eyes and ears and made important discoveries about their structures and how they worked. He also recognized the importance of the heart in regards to the circulating of blood throughout the body, although his understanding of the circulatory system was not as advanced as that of later physicians.

Alcmaeon's ideas about the brain and the senses had a huge impact on the development of ancient Greek philosophy. His understanding of the brain as the area where intelligence and consciousness were created challenged the beliefs about the nature of the soul and the mind at the time. Alcmaeon's work laid the foundation for later philosophical and scientific debates about the relationship between the body and the mind, and his ideas continue to influence our thinking about these issues today.

Alcmaeon's work had an important impact on the development of Western medicine as well. His emphasis on observation and dissection helped to establish a scientific approach to medicine that highlighted the importance of empirical evidence and experimentation. Alcmaeon's work on the brain and the senses also helped to establish the importance of understanding the underlying physiological workings of diseases, which created a foundation for later advances in medical science.

Alcmaeon of Croton was a pioneer in the history of medicine and science. His work on the brain, the senses, and human anatomy allowed for later advances in these fields, and his emphasis on observation and experimentation helped to create a scientific approach to medicine that remains central to our understanding of the human body and mind today. Alcmaeon's ideas continue to influence our thinking about the conscious, the relationship between the body and the mind, and the physiological mechanisms of diseases. His legacy as a scientist, philosopher, and physician continues to be seen today, almost 2,500 years after his death.

== See also ==
- Galen of Pergamon – influenced by Alcmaeon of Croton
- Hippocrates
- Cephalocentric hypothesis
