= Glossary of neuroscience =

This is a glossary of terms, concepts, and structures relevant to the study of the nervous system.

== A ==
Acetylcholine
A neurotransmitter involved in muscle activation, attention, arousal, and memory. It acts at both nicotinic and muscarinic receptors throughout the central and peripheral nervous systems.

Achromatopsia
Loss of color vision as a result of damage to extrastriate visual cortex.

Action Potential
A rapid electrical signal that travels down the axon of a neuron.

Activation
The time-dependent opening of ion channels in response to a stimulus, typically membrane depolarization.

Adaptation
The phenomenon of sensory receptor adjustment to different levels of stimulation; critical for allowing sensory systems to operate over a wide dynamic range.

Adenylyl cyclase
Membrane-bound enzyme that can be activated by G-proteins to catalyze the synthesis of cyclic AMP from ATP.

Adrenal cortex
The outer region of the adrenal gland, responsible for producing steroid hormones such as cortisol and aldosterone, which regulate metabolism and stress responses.

Adrenal medulla
The central part of the adrenal gland that, under visceral motor stimulation, secretes epinephrine and norepinephrine into the bloodstream.

Adrenaline
See epinephrine.

Afferent nerve fiber
An axon that conducts action potentials from the periphery toward the central nervous system.

Agnosia
The inability to name objects, typically resulting from brain damage in the occipital or temporal lobes.

Agonist
A chemical that binds to and activates a receptor, mimicking the action of a natural neurotransmitter.

Akinesia
A loss or impairment of voluntary movement, often associated with Parkinson's disease and basal ganglia dysfunction.

Allodynia
A condition in which normally non-painful stimuli are perceived as painful, often due to nerve damage or sensitization.

Alpha wave
A type of brainwave oscillation in the frequency range of 8–13 Hz, commonly associated with relaxed, wakeful states and measured using electroencephalography (EEG).

Alzheimer's disease
A progressive neurodegenerative disorder characterized by memory loss, cognitive decline, and the presence of amyloid plaques and neurofibrillary tangles in the brain.

Amygdala
A brain structure involved in emotion, particularly fear, aggression, and emotional memory formation. It is part of the limbic system.

Anencephaly
A severe congenital condition in which a major portion of the brain, skull, and scalp is missing due to failed closure of the neural tube.

Anhedonia
The inability to experience pleasure, commonly associated with depression and certain neurological disorders.

Anterograde amnesia
A form of memory loss in which new memories cannot be formed following brain injury or trauma; often associated with damage to the hippocampus.

Anterior cingulate cortex
A region of the cingulate cortex implicated in functions such as emotion regulation, cognitive control, error detection, and decision-making.

Aphasia
A language disorder resulting from brain damage, most often in the left hemisphere, that affects the production or comprehension of speech and writing.

Apoptosis
A form of programmed cell death involved in development and disease. In the nervous system, apoptosis shapes neural circuits and removes damaged neurons.

Arachnoid mater
The middle of the three layers of the meninges that surround the brain and spinal cord, located between the dura mater and the pia mater.

Arousal
A physiological and psychological state of alertness and readiness, regulated by the reticular activating system and neurotransmitters such as norepinephrine and dopamine.

Astrocyte
A star-shaped glial cell in the central nervous system involved in maintaining the blood–brain barrier, regulating neurotransmitter levels, and supporting neuronal function.

Ataxia
A neurological symptom characterized by a lack of coordination and balance, typically caused by damage to the cerebellum or its connections.

Auditory cortex
A part of the temporal lobe responsible for processing auditory information, including pitch, volume, and sound localization.

Autonomic nervous system
A division of the peripheral nervous system that controls involuntary physiological processes, including heart rate, digestion, and respiration. It is divided into the sympathetic and parasympathetic systems.

Axon
A long, slender projection of a neuron that conducts action potentials away from the cell body to synaptic terminals, where neurotransmitters are released.

Axon hillock
The cone-shaped region of a neuron’s soma where the axon originates and action potentials are typically initiated.

== B ==
Babinski sign
A reflex where the big toe extends upward and the other toes fan out when the sole of the foot is stimulated. Present in infants, but indicative of damage to the corticospinal tract in adults.

Barrel cortex
A region of the somatosensory cortex in rodents that contains clusters of neurons corresponding to individual whiskers, used as a model for studying sensory processing and plasticity.

Baroreceptor
A sensory nerve ending in blood vessels that detects changes in blood pressure and relays information to the brainstem for autonomic regulation.

Basal ganglia
A group of subcortical nuclei involved in motor control, procedural learning, routine behaviors or "habits", and cognition. Dysfunction is associated with Parkinson’s disease, Huntington’s disease, and other movement disorders.

Behavioral neuroscience
A subfield of neuroscience that explores how the brain affects behavior, often using techniques from biology, psychology, and physiology.

Beta wave
A type of brain wave oscillation in the frequency range of approximately 13–30 Hz, typically associated with active concentration, alertness, and cognitive engagement.

Bilateral
In neuroscience, refers to structures or functions that involve both sides of the brain or body. For example, bilateral activation may occur in both hemispheres during a cognitive task.

Binocular rivalry
A phenomenon that occurs when two different images are presented to each eye, and perception alternates between them. It is used to study visual awareness and consciousness.

Bipolar cell
A type of amacrine cell that transmits signals from photoreceptors (rods and cones) to ganglion cells in the eye, playing a key role in visual processing.

Bipolar disorder
A mood disorder characterized by alternating episodes of depression and mania, associated with dysregulation in neurotransmitter systems and structural brain changes.

Blood–brain barrier (BBB)
A selective barrier formed by endothelial cells lining brain capillaries that restricts the passage of substances from the bloodstream into the central nervous system, protecting the brain from pathogens and toxins.

Bouton
Also known as an axon terminal or synaptic bouton, this is the swollen end of an axon where neurotransmitters are released into the synaptic cleft.

Brain
The central organ of the nervous system, responsible for processing sensory information, regulating bodily functions, and enabling thought, emotion, memory, and consciousness.

Brain-derived neurotrophic factor (BDNF)
A protein that supports the survival of existing neurons and encourages the growth and differentiation of new neurons and synapses. It is crucial for long-term memory and synaptic plasticity.

Brain plasticity
Also called neuroplasticity, this refers to the brain’s ability to reorganize and adapt by forming new neural connections throughout life, especially after injury or in response to learning and experience.

Brainstem
The posterior part of the brain that connects the cerebrum with the spinal cord. It includes the midbrain, pons, and medulla oblongata and regulates essential functions such as breathing, heart rate, and sleep.

Brain ventricles
A set of interconnected cavities within the brain that produce and circulate cerebrospinal fluid (CSF). Includes the lateral, third, and fourth ventricles.

Brain waves
Patterns of electrical activity in the brain, typically detected by electroencephalography (EEG). Brain waves are categorized by frequency, such as alpha, beta, delta, and theta waves.

Brain-computer interface (BCI)
A technology that enables direct communication between the brain and an external device, often used in research, prosthetics, and communication aids for individuals with disabilities.

Bradykinesia
Slowness of movement, often a symptom of Parkinson’s disease and other disorders involving the basal ganglia.

Broca's area
A region in the frontal lobe, typically in the left hemisphere, associated with the production of speech. Damage can result in Broca's aphasia, characterized by impaired speech fluency.

Broca's aphasia
A language disorder caused by damage to Broca's area, resulting in slow, laborious speech with relatively preserved comprehension.

Brodmann areas
Regions of the cerebral cortex defined by Korbinian Brodmann based on cytoarchitecture. These areas are still widely used to describe functional brain localization (e.g., Brodmann area 17 = primary visual cortex).

Burst firing
A pattern of rapid spikes from a neuron followed by a period of quiescence. It plays a role in sensory encoding and signal amplification in various brain circuits.

== C ==
Calcium channel
A type of ion channel located on the cell membrane that allows the selective entry of calcium ions (Ca²⁺) into the neuron, playing a crucial role in neurotransmitter release, gene expression, and synaptic plasticity.

Capsaicin
A compound found in chili peppers that activates TRPV1 receptors on sensory neurons, leading to the sensation of heat or burning. It is used in research and in topical analgesics for chronic pain.

Caudate nucleus
A C-shaped structure located in the basal ganglia, involved in motor control, learning, memory, and reward processing. It works closely with the putamen and globus pallidus.

Central nervous system (CNS)
Consists of the brain and spinal cord, responsible for processing and coordinating sensory data and motor commands.

Cerebellum
A brain structure located at the back of the skull that plays a central role in motor coordination, balance, posture, and some cognitive functions such as attention and language.

Cerebral cortex
The outermost layer of the cerebrum, composed of gray matter. It is involved in higher-order brain functions such as sensory perception, language, decision-making, and voluntary motor control.

Cerebral hemisphere
One of the two halves of the cerebrum, divided into left and right hemispheres. Each hemisphere specializes in different functions but communicates via the corpus callosum.

Cerebrospinal fluid (CSF)
A clear fluid found in the brain and spinal cord that cushions neural tissue, removes waste, and provides nutrients. It circulates through the ventricular system and subarachnoid space.

Chemoreceptor
A sensory receptor that responds to chemical stimuli, such as taste molecules or blood oxygen levels. Located in tissues including the tongue, nasal cavity, and blood vessels.

Cholinergic
Refers to cells or systems that use acetylcholine as a neurotransmitter. Cholinergic neurons are involved in memory, attention, and muscle activation.

Choroid plexus
A network of cells located in the ventricles of the brain that produces cerebrospinal fluid and contributes to the maintenance of the blood–CSF barrier.

Chromatolysis
A cellular response to neuronal injury, characterized by swelling of the cell body and dispersal of Nissl substance, indicating a disruption in protein synthesis.

Cingulate cortex
A part of the limbic system located on the medial side of the cerebral hemispheres. It is involved in emotion formation, pain perception, decision-making, and cognitive control.

Cognition
The set of mental processes involved in acquiring knowledge and understanding through thought, experience, and the senses. Includes attention, memory, language, and problem-solving.

Cognitive neuroscience
A field that studies the biological processes underlying cognition, focusing on how brain structure and function give rise to mental activities.

Commissure
A bundle of nerve fibers that connects corresponding areas between the two hemispheres of the brain. The largest is the corpus callosum.

Conditioned stimulus
In classical conditioning, a previously neutral stimulus that, after being paired with an unconditioned stimulus, elicits a learned response.

Conduction velocity
The speed at which an action potential travels along a nerve fiber. It is influenced by factors such as axon diameter and myelination.

Consciousness
A state of awareness of self and the environment. In neuroscience, it involves the coordinated activity of multiple brain regions, particularly the thalamocortical system.

Corpus callosum
The largest white matter structure in the brain, consisting of a thick band of axons that connects the left and right cerebral hemispheres.

Cortical column
A vertically organized group of neurons in the cerebral cortex that processes the same type of information, such as orientation or location in space. It is a basic functional unit of the cortex.

Cortical plasticity
The ability of the cerebral cortex to adapt and reorganize in response to experience, learning, or injury.

Corticospinal tract
A major descending pathway from the motor cortex to the spinal cord that mediates voluntary motor control, especially fine movements of the limbs.

Creutzfeldt–Jakob disease (CJD)
A rare and fatal neurodegenerative disorder caused by misfolded prion proteins. It leads to rapid cognitive decline, motor dysfunction, and ultimately death.

Critical period
A developmental window during which the nervous system is particularly sensitive to certain environmental stimuli, crucial for proper development of functions such as vision and language.

Cross modal plasticity
The ability of one sensory modality to reorganize and compensate in another’s absence (e.g., visual cortex being recruited for touch in individuals who are blind).

== D ==
Dendrite
A branched projection of a neuron that receives synaptic input from other neurons and transmits electrical signals toward the cell body.

Dendritic spine
A small, membranous protrusion from a neuron's dendrite that typically receives input from a single synapse of an axon. Spines are key sites for synaptic strength and plasticity.

Depolarization
A change in membrane potential that makes the interior of a neuron more positive relative to the outside, often initiating an action potential if a threshold is reached.

Descending neuron
A neuron that originates in the brain or brainstem and projects downward through the spinal cord to influence motor circuits and autonomic function. Descending neurons are critical for voluntary movement, postural control, and reflex modulation. Major descending pathways include the corticospinal, reticulospinal, rubrospinal, and vestibulospinal tracts.

Developmental neuroscience
A branch of neuroscience focused on how the nervous system develops from embryonic stages through adulthood, including neurogenesis, synaptogenesis, and pruning.

Diffusion tensor imaging (DTI)
A form of magnetic resonance imaging that maps the diffusion of water molecules in brain tissue to visualize white matter tracts and structural connectivity.

Diencephalon
A region of the forebrain that includes structures such as the thalamus and hypothalamus. It plays a role in sensory relay, autonomic function, and endocrine regulation.

Diffuse axonal injury
A form of traumatic brain injury where widespread lesions in white matter tracts occur due to rapid acceleration or deceleration, commonly associated with concussions and coma.

Dissociation (neuropsychology)
A situation where one cognitive function is impaired while another is preserved, often used to infer the independence of brain processes or structures.

Dizygotic twins
Also known as fraternal twins; twins that result from two separate eggs fertilized by two different sperm. Used in genetic studies to explore heritability in neurological traits.

Dopamine
A neurotransmitter involved in reward, motivation, motor control, and mood regulation. Imbalances are associated with disorders such as Parkinson’s disease, schizophrenia, and addiction.

Dorsal column–medial lemniscus pathway
A sensory pathway of the spinal cord that conveys fine touch, vibration, and proprioceptive information to the brain.

Dorsal horn
A region in the gray matter of the spinal cord that receives and processes incoming sensory information from peripheral nerves.

Dorsal root ganglion
A cluster of sensory neuron cell bodies located just outside the spinal cord, which transmit sensory signals to the central nervous system.

Dorsal stream
One of the two major visual processing pathways in the brain. Often referred to as the “where” pathway, it processes motion and spatial information.

Downregulation
A decrease in the number or sensitivity of receptors in response to prolonged stimulation by a neurotransmitter or drug, reducing cellular response.

Dualism
A philosophical position asserting that the mind and body are fundamentally distinct entities. In neuroscience, it contrasts with monistic and physicalist views of consciousness.

Dynein
A motor protein that moves along microtubules in the cytoskeleton, transporting cellular cargo toward the center of the cell. In neurons, dynein is important for retrograde axonal transport.

Dysarthria
A motor speech disorder resulting from impaired control of the muscles used in speech, often due to neurological damage to the brainstem or cerebellum.

Dyskinesia
Involuntary, erratic, or repetitive movements, often associated with long-term use of dopaminergic drugs in Parkinson’s disease.

Dyslexia
A neurodevelopmental disorder characterized by difficulty with accurate and/or fluent word recognition, often linked to deficits in phonological processing and left hemisphere brain function.

Dyspraxia
A developmental coordination disorder involving difficulty with motor planning and execution, affecting balance, fine motor tasks, and speech.

== E ==
EEG (Electroencephalography)
A non-invasive method of recording electrical activity in the brain using electrodes placed on the scalp. It is commonly used to study sleep, epilepsy, and cognitive processes.

Effector
A muscle, gland, or organ that performs an action in response to a neural signal, typically from the motor neuron.

Efferent nerve fiber
An axon that carries motor signals away from the central nervous system to muscles or glands. Opposite of afferent nerve fiber.

Electroconvulsive therapy (ECT)
A psychiatric treatment in which seizures are electrically induced in anesthetized patients for therapeutic effect, often used for treatment-resistant depression.

Electrode
A conductor used to detect or deliver electrical signals in neural recording or stimulation. Electrodes can be surface (non-invasive), intracranial, or implanted.

Electromyography (EMG)
A technique for recording the electrical activity produced by skeletal muscles, often used in neuromuscular diagnostics and motor control studies.

Electrophysiology
The study of the electrical properties of biological cells and tissues. In neuroscience, it often involves measuring voltage changes or currents in neurons.

Endocannabinoid system
A neuromodulatory system composed of endocannabinoids, receptors (e.g., CB1), and enzymes. It regulates processes such as appetite, pain, mood, and memory.

Endocrine system
A collection of glands that secrete hormones directly into the bloodstream. It interacts with the nervous system to regulate metabolism, stress, and growth.

Endogenous
Originating from within an organism, tissue, or cell. In neuroscience, it typically refers to naturally occurring neurotransmitters or signaling molecules.

Endorphins
Endogenous opioid peptides that bind to opioid receptors and act as natural painkillers and mood enhancers.

Engram
A theoretical physical trace or biological substrate of memory in the brain. The term is used in memory research to describe the neural changes underlying a specific memory.

Enteric nervous system
A subdivision of the autonomic nervous system that governs the function of the gastrointestinal system. Sometimes called the "second brain."

Epinephrine
A hormone and neurotransmitter (also known as adrenaline) involved in the body’s fight-or-flight response. Produced in the adrenal medulla.

EPSP (Excitatory Postsynaptic Potential)
A depolarizing event in a postsynaptic neuron caused by the influx of positive ions, making the neuron more likely to fire an action potential.

Equilibrium potential
The membrane potential at which there is no net flow of a particular ion across the cell membrane. It can be calculated using the Nernst equation.

Estrogen
A steroid hormone that, in addition to reproductive functions, affects brain structure, cognition, and neuroprotection, particularly in areas such as the hippocampus.

Evoked potential
A measured electrical response of the nervous system to a specific sensory, motor, or cognitive stimulus, commonly recorded with EEG.

Excitability
The ability of a neuron or muscle cell to respond to a stimulus and generate an action potential.

Excitotoxicity
Cell death caused by excessive stimulation by neurotransmitters such as glutamate, leading to calcium overload and neuronal damage. It is implicated in stroke and neurodegenerative diseases.

Executive function
A set of cognitive processes including working memory, flexible thinking, and self-control. Primarily associated with the prefrontal cortex.

Exocytosis
The process by which vesicles release their contents outside the cell. In neurons, it refers to the release of neurotransmitters into the synaptic cleft.

Extracellular matrix
A network of proteins and molecules outside cells

== F ==
Facial nerve (Cranial Nerve VII)
A cranial nerve that controls the muscles of facial expression, conveys taste sensations from the anterior two-thirds of the tongue, and carries parasympathetic fibers to salivary and lacrimal glands.

Facilitation
A short-term increase in synaptic strength resulting from prior activity, due to residual calcium in the presynaptic terminal. It contributes to short-term plasticity and temporal coding.

Fear conditioning
A form of associative learning in which a neutral stimulus becomes associated with an aversive event. It is often used to study emotional memory and the role of the amygdala.

Fiber tract
A bundle of axons in the central nervous system that connects different brain regions. Examples include the corpus callosum, optic tract, and corticospinal tract.

Field potential
An electrical potential recorded from a population of neurons, often reflecting the summed synaptic input to a region. Measured using electroencephalography or implanted electrodes.

Fight-or-flight response
A physiological reaction to perceived threat or danger, involving the sympathetic nervous system and hormones such as epinephrine and cortisol.

Forebrain
The largest part of the brain, consisting of the cerebrum, thalamus, and hypothalamus. It is involved in complex behaviors, emotion, and cognition.

Fornix
A C-shaped bundle of white matter fibers that connects the hippocampus to the hypothalamus and other structures in the limbic system. Important for memory and emotional regulation.

Free nerve ending
A type of unencapsulated nerve ending that detects pain, temperature, and crude touch. These are the most common type of cutaneous receptors.

Frontal lobe
A region of the cerebral cortex involved in decision-making, planning, motor function, problem-solving, and aspects of personality. Located at the front of each cerebral hemisphere.

Frontal eye fields
A region in the frontal lobe involved in voluntary eye movements and visual attention. It plays a role in saccadic control and visual tracking.

Functional connectivity
A measure of how different brain regions interact during rest or tasks, often assessed using fMRI or EEG by examining correlations in activity over time.

Functional magnetic resonance imaging (fMRI)
A neuroimaging technique that measures brain activity by detecting changes in blood oxygenation (BOLD signal). It is used to study brain function in real time.

Fusiform gyrus
A brain region located in the temporal and occipital lobes involved in high-level visual processing, including facial recognition and object categorization.

Fusiform face area (FFA)
A specialized part of the fusiform gyrus that responds selectively to faces. It is often studied in the context of prosopagnosia (face blindness) and visual expertise.

== G ==
GABA (Gamma-Aminobutyric Acid)
The primary inhibitory neurotransmitter in the central nervous system. It reduces neuronal excitability and is involved in sleep, anxiety, and motor control.

Gag reflex
A protective reflex that prevents choking, triggered by stimulation of the back of the throat. It involves cranial nerves IX and X and is used to assess brainstem function.

Ganglion
A cluster of neuronal cell bodies located outside the central nervous system. Examples include the dorsal root ganglia and autonomic ganglia.

Gap junction
A direct electrical connection between adjacent neurons or glial cells formed by connexin proteins. Gap junctions allow ions and small molecules to pass rapidly between cells.

Gene knockout
A genetic technique used to inactivate or "knock out" a specific gene in an organism to study its function. Widely used in neuroscience to explore gene roles in brain development and behavior.

Genetic predisposition
An increased likelihood of developing a particular disease based on an individual's genetic makeup. In neuroscience, it is relevant to conditions like schizophrenia and Alzheimer's disease.

Geniculate body
A relay structure in the thalamus. The lateral geniculate body is involved in visual processing; the medial geniculate body is involved in auditory processing.

Gephyrin
A scaffolding protein that anchors inhibitory neurotransmitter receptors (GABA and glycine) at postsynaptic sites. Essential for synapse formation and stability.

Glia
Non-neuronal cells in the nervous system that support, nourish, and protect neurons. Types include astrocytes, oligodendrocytes, microglia, and Schwann cells.

Glia limitans
A thin layer of astrocytic endfeet beneath the pia mater that forms part of the barrier separating the brain parenchyma from the cerebrospinal fluid.

Glial scar
A dense accumulation of glial cells, particularly astrocytes, that forms after central nervous system injury. It helps contain damage but can also inhibit axonal regeneration.

Glioblastoma
A highly aggressive and malignant brain tumor arising from glial cells. It is the most common primary brain cancer in adults and often has a poor prognosis.

Glucocorticoid
A class of steroid hormones released by the adrenal cortex in response to stress. They influence metabolism and have significant effects on memory and the hippocampus.

Glutamate
The main excitatory neurotransmitter in the brain. It is essential for learning, memory, and synaptic plasticity, but excessive levels can cause excitotoxicity.

Glutamatergic
Describes neurons or synapses that use glutamate as a neurotransmitter. These are the majority of excitatory synapses in the brain.

Glycine
An inhibitory neurotransmitter found primarily in the spinal cord and brainstem. It acts via glycine receptors and contributes to motor control and reflexes.

Golgi cell
A type of inhibitory interneuron in the cerebellum that regulates input from mossy fibers to granule cells via GABA release.

Golgi stain
A silver staining method that randomly labels a small subset of neurons in their entirety, allowing detailed study of neuronal morphology.

G-protein-coupled receptor (GPCR)
A large family of membrane receptors that activate intracellular signaling pathways through G-proteins. GPCRs are critical in neurotransmission, hormone signaling, and sensory perception.

Granule cell
A small neuron found in the cerebellum, olfactory bulb, and dentate gyrus of the hippocampus. Granule cells play important roles in sensory and motor information processing.

Granulomatosis with polyangiitis
An autoimmune disease that can affect the central nervous system, sometimes causing neuropathy, headaches, or stroke-like symptoms due to vascular inflammation.

Grasp reflex
A primitive reflex seen in infants where touching the palm induces the hand to close. Persistence in adults may indicate frontal lobe damage.

Gray matter
Brain tissue composed primarily of neuronal cell bodies, dendrites, and unmyelinated axons. It is responsible for information processing and synaptic transmission.

Growth cone
A dynamic, motile structure at the tip of a developing axon or dendrite that guides neuronal growth by sensing molecular cues in the environment.

Growth factor
A naturally occurring protein that stimulates cell growth, differentiation, and survival. Examples include BDNF, NGF, and EGF in neural development and repair.

Gustatory cortex
The brain area responsible for processing taste information, primarily located in the insular and frontal opercular regions.

Gyri (singular
gyrus)
The raised ridges or folds of the cerebral cortex. They increase the brain’s surface area and are separated by sulci (grooves).

Gyrification
The process by which the cerebral cortex develops folds (gyri) and grooves (sulci) during brain development. Gyrification increases the surface area of the brain, allowing for greater cognitive capacity within the limited volume of the skull.

== H ==
Habituation
A form of non-associative learning in which an organism decreases or ceases its responses to a repetitive, harmless stimulus over time.

Hallucination
A perception in the absence of external stimulus, such as hearing voices or seeing things that are not present. Common in conditions like schizophrenia or sensory deprivation.

Hemispheres of the brain
The two symmetrical halves of the brain—left and right—that control opposite sides of the body. Each hemisphere has specialized functions but works in coordination with the other.

Hemispatial neglect
A neuropsychological condition in which a person fails to attend to one side of space, usually the left, following damage to the right parietal lobe.

Hering’s law of equal innervation
A principle in ocular motor control stating that yoked eye muscles receive equal neural signals to maintain coordinated binocular eye movements.

Hertz (Hz)
A unit of frequency equal to one cycle per second. Used in neuroscience to describe brain wave activity, neural firing rates, and oscillations.

Hindbrain
The posterior part of the brain, including the medulla oblongata, pons, and cerebellum. It regulates vital autonomic functions and coordinates movement.

Hippocampus
A brain structure located in the medial temporal lobe, critical for memory formation, spatial navigation, and learning. Damage is associated with anterograde amnesia.

Histamine
A neurotransmitter involved in arousal, wakefulness, and inflammatory responses. Histaminergic neurons are primarily located in the hypothalamus.

Histology
The microscopic study of tissues, including the structure of neural tissue such as neurons, glia, and blood vessels.

Homeostasis
The regulation of internal conditions to maintain a stable physiological state. The hypothalamus plays a key role in regulating temperature, hunger, and other homeostatic processes.

Homunculus
A distorted representation of the human body based on the relative amount of cortex devoted to each body part, especially in the somatosensory and motor areas.

Horizontal cell
A type of retinal interneuron that connects photoreceptors and helps integrate and regulate input in the outer retina, contributing to contrast enhancement.

Hormone
A signaling molecule released by glands that affects target cells in other parts of the body. Some hormones, like cortisol and estrogen, influence brain function and behavior.

HPA axis (Hypothalamic–Pituitary–Adrenal axis)
A major neuroendocrine system that controls stress response, digestion, mood, immune function, and energy usage through hormone release.

Huntington's disease
A genetic neurodegenerative disorder caused by a mutation in the HTT gene, leading to motor dysfunction, cognitive decline, and psychiatric symptoms. It involves degeneration of the basal ganglia.

Hydrocephalus
A condition in which excess cerebrospinal fluid accumulates in the brain's ventricles, leading to increased intracranial pressure. It may result from developmental issues, trauma, or infection.

Hyperalgesia
Increased sensitivity to pain, often resulting from inflammation or damage to nociceptive pathways.

Hyperpolarization
A change in a cell’s membrane potential that makes it more negative, decreasing the likelihood of firing an action potential.

Hypoglossal nerve (Cranial Nerve XII)
A cranial nerve responsible for controlling the muscles of the tongue. Damage can cause slurred speech and difficulty swallowing.

Hypothalamus
A region of the brain below the thalamus that regulates homeostatic functions such as hunger, thirst, body temperature, and circadian rhythms. It controls the pituitary gland and links the nervous and endocrine systems.

== I ==
Iatrogenic
A condition unintentionally caused by medical treatment or diagnostic procedures. In neuroscience, may refer to nerve damage, seizures, or cognitive effects resulting from interventions.

Ictal
Relating to or occurring during a seizure or convulsion. Commonly used in the context of epilepsy, such as "ictal phase" versus "postictal phase."

Imaging genetics
A research field that combines brain imaging and genetics to investigate how genetic variation affects brain structure and function.

Immunohistochemistry
A technique that uses antibodies to detect specific proteins or antigens in tissue sections. Frequently used to visualize neuronal and glial markers.

Implicit memory
Unconscious memory of skills and procedures, such as riding a bike or playing an instrument. Associated with brain structures like the basal ganglia and cerebellum.

Incus
One of the three auditory ossicles in the middle ear that transmits sound vibrations from the malleus to the stapes.

Independent component analysis (ICA)
A computational method used to separate mixed signals into independent sources. Commonly used in EEG and fMRI to identify distinct brain activity patterns.

Inferior colliculus
A midbrain structure involved in auditory processing, particularly sound localization and reflexive responses to sound stimuli.

Inferior olive
A brainstem nucleus that sends climbing fiber inputs to the cerebellum and plays a critical role in motor learning and coordination.

Inhibitory postsynaptic potential (IPSP)
A type of synaptic potential that makes a neuron less likely to fire an action potential, usually by allowing chloride or potassium ions to enter the cell.

Innervation
The supply of nerves to a specific body part. In neuroscience, it describes how neurons connect to and control muscles, glands, or other neurons.

Input resistance
A measure of how much a neuron's membrane resists incoming current. It influences how strongly the cell responds to synaptic inputs.

Insular cortex
A region buried within the lateral sulcus, involved in interoception, emotion, taste, and awareness of bodily states.

Intelligence quotient (IQ)
A standardized measure of cognitive ability. In neuroscience, research explores how brain structure and function relate to individual differences in IQ.

Interneuron
A neuron that connects other neurons within a neural circuit, typically within the same brain region or spinal segment. Often inhibitory and essential for reflexes and signal modulation.

Intracranial pressure
The pressure inside the skull, exerted by brain tissue, blood, and cerebrospinal fluid. Abnormal levels can cause headaches, vision problems, or brain damage.

Intracellular recording
A technique used to measure the voltage or current inside a neuron, providing detailed information about membrane potential and ionic currents.

Ion channel
A pore-forming membrane protein that allows ions to pass in and out of neurons. Ion channels are critical for generating and propagating electrical signals.

Ionotropic receptor
A type of receptor that directly opens an ion channel upon neurotransmitter binding, allowing rapid synaptic transmission (e.g., NMDA receptor, AMPA receptor).

== J ==
Jacksonian seizure
A type of focal seizure that begins in one area of the body (typically a finger or toe) and "marches" to adjacent areas, reflecting orderly spread of abnormal activity in the motor cortex.

James–Lange theory
A historical theory of emotion proposing that emotions result from physiological responses to stimuli (e.g., "We are afraid because we tremble"). While outdated, it laid groundwork for modern affective neuroscience.

Jaw jerk reflex
A stretch reflex elicited by tapping the chin, which causes the jaw to jerk upward. Used clinically to assess integrity of the trigeminal nerve and brainstem reflex circuits.

Jitter
The variability in timing of neural spike trains or signal transmission, especially in motor units or brain-computer interface systems. High jitter can affect signal fidelity.

JNK pathway (c-Jun N-terminal kinase pathway)
A signaling cascade involved in stress responses, apoptosis, and neurodegeneration. Dysregulation of the JNK pathway is linked to Alzheimer’s disease and neuronal injury.

Joubert syndrome
A rare genetic disorder characterized by abnormal development of the cerebellar vermis and brainstem, leading to hypotonia, ataxia, abnormal breathing, and developmental delay.

Juxtacrine signaling
A form of cell-to-cell communication where signaling molecules are transmitted directly through contact, rather than being secreted. Important in neural development and synaptogenesis.

Juxtarestiform body
A bundle of fibers within the inferior cerebellar peduncle that connects the vestibular nuclei to the cerebellum, involved in balance and eye movement coordination.

Junctional complex
A structural region where neurons, glia, or epithelial cells make close contact. In the nervous system, includes tight junctions and adherens junctions that help form the blood–brain barrier.

== K ==
K-complex
A large, slow wave seen in EEG during stage 2 of non-REM sleep. It is involved in memory consolidation and sensory processing during sleep.

Kainate receptor
A subtype of ionotropic glutamate receptor involved in fast excitatory synaptic transmission. Kainate receptors play roles in learning and are implicated in seizure disorders.

Kallmann syndrome
A genetic condition characterized by delayed or absent puberty and an impaired sense of smell. It results from disrupted migration of olfactory and gonadotropin-releasing hormone neurons.

Karyokinesis
The process of nuclear division during cell division. In the context of developmental neuroscience, it describes how neural progenitor cells divide in the developing brain.

Karyotype
A visual profile of an organism’s chromosomes. In neuroscience, used in research or diagnostics for identifying chromosomal abnormalities linked to neurodevelopmental disorders.

Kelvin–Voigt model
A viscoelastic model used in computational neuroscience and biomechanics to describe tissue deformation, including brain tissue mechanics.

Keratitis
Inflammation of the cornea, which may be linked to neural dysfunction in the trigeminal nerve or autonomic nervous system regulation.

Kinesthesia
The sense of limb and body movement, closely related to proprioception. It is mediated by mechanoreceptors in muscles and joints and processed in the somatosensory cortex.

Kindling
A process by which repeated sub-threshold electrical or chemical stimulation of the brain leads to progressively more intense seizures. Used as a model for epilepsy.

Kleptomania
A psychiatric disorder characterized by recurrent urges to steal items not needed for personal use or value. Considered in neuropsychiatry as a type of impulse control disorder involving frontal lobe dysfunction.

Klüver–Bucy syndrome
A behavioral disorder caused by bilateral lesions of the amygdala and temporal lobes, resulting in hyperorality, hypersexuality, and emotional blunting.

Knock-in
A genetic technique where a gene is replaced or inserted at a specific locus, allowing researchers to study the function of specific mutations in neural systems.

Knockout mouse
A genetically engineered mouse in which one or more genes have been turned off through targeted mutation. Frequently used to study gene function in brain development and behavior.

Korsakoff syndrome
A chronic memory disorder caused by thiamine (vitamin B1) deficiency, most commonly due to chronic alcohol misuse. It involves degeneration of the mammillary bodies and medial thalamus.

Krebs cycle (Citric acid cycle)
A key metabolic pathway that provides energy to neurons. Although a general biology term, it is critical in neuroscience for understanding brain metabolism and mitochondrial function.

Kymograph
An old device used to record changes in physiological activity over time, such as muscle contractions or nerve responses. Historically significant in neuroscience research.

== L ==
Lamina
A layer of neurons in a neural structure. In the spinal cord and cerebral cortex, laminae are functionally and anatomically distinct.

Lateral geniculate nucleus (LGN)
A relay center in the thalamus that receives input from the retina and sends visual information to the visual cortex.

Lateral inhibition
A neural mechanism in which an excited neuron reduces the activity of its neighbors. Enhances contrast in sensory systems such as vision and touch.

Lateral sulcus
A deep groove in the cerebral cortex that separates the frontal lobe and parietal lobe from the temporal lobe.

Learning
The acquisition of new knowledge or skills through experience, study, or teaching. In neuroscience, learning is linked to synaptic plasticity and neural circuit changes.

Learning
A neurobiological process through which experience induces lasting changes in the nervous system, leading to the acquisition or modification of behavior, knowledge, or skills.

Lentiform nucleus
A structure within the basal ganglia composed of the putamen and globus pallidus, involved in motor control and learning.

Lesion
Damage or abnormal change in brain tissue, caused by injury, stroke, disease, or surgery. Lesion studies are used to investigate brain function.

Levodopa
A precursor to dopamine used in the treatment of Parkinson’s disease. It crosses the blood–brain barrier and is converted to dopamine in the brain.

Limbic system
A group of interconnected brain structures involved in emotion, motivation, memory, and olfaction. Includes the amygdala, hippocampus, and cingulate cortex.

Lissencephaly
A rare brain malformation where the cerebral cortex lacks normal folds (gyri), leading to developmental delay and seizures.

Long-term depression (LTD)
A long-lasting decrease in synaptic strength following low-frequency stimulation. Thought to be important in motor learning and memory pruning.

Long-term memory
Stored information retained for extended periods—from hours to years. Includes declarative (explicit) and non-declarative (implicit) forms.

Long-term potentiation (LTP)
A long-lasting enhancement in signal transmission between two neurons that results from their synchronous activation. A major cellular mechanism underlying learning and memory.

Low-threshold spikes
A burst of action potentials generated by the activation of low-threshold, T-type calcium channels in response to a small depolarization from a hyperpolarized membrane potential. Commonly observed in thalamic neurons, low-threshold spikes enable rhythmic firing and are important for sleep-related oscillations and sensory signal gating.

Lower motor neuron
A neuron that directly innervates skeletal muscle. Damage to these neurons causes flaccid paralysis, muscle atrophy, and loss of reflexes.

LTP induction
The process of initiating long-term potentiation through specific patterns of synaptic stimulation, such as high-frequency tetanic stimulation.

Lucid dreaming
A state during which the dreamer is aware that they are dreaming and may be able to exert control over the dream. Associated with increased prefrontal cortex activity.

Luria–Nebraska Neuropsychological Battery
A standardized test battery used to assess a wide range of cognitive and motor functions. Based on the work of Alexander Luria, it helps localize brain dysfunction.

== M ==
Magnetic resonance imaging (MRI)
A non-invasive imaging technique that uses magnetic fields and radio waves to visualize detailed structures of the brain and other tissues.

Malleus
One of the three auditory ossicles in the middle ear. It transmits sound vibrations from the eardrum to the incus.

Mammillary bodies
Small round structures located in the hypothalamus involved in memory processing. Often damaged in Korsakoff syndrome.

MAPK/ERK pathway
A cellular signaling cascade involved in growth, differentiation, and survival. It plays roles in synaptic plasticity and neurodegeneration.

Medial geniculate nucleus
A relay center in the thalamus for auditory information, sending signals from the inner ear to the auditory cortex.

Medial longitudinal fasciculus
A bundle of nerve fibers in the brainstem involved in coordinating eye movements and head motion, especially during the vestibulo-ocular reflex.

Medulla oblongata
The lower part of the brainstem, responsible for autonomic functions such as respiration, heart rate, and blood pressure.

Melatonin
A hormone produced by the pineal gland that regulates circadian rhythms and the sleep–wake cycle. Secretion is influenced by light exposure.

Memory
The mental capacity to encode, store, and retrieve information. Subtypes include working memory, short-term memory, and long-term memory.

Meninges
The three protective membranes—dura mater, arachnoid mater, and pia mater—that surround the brain and spinal cord.

Merkel cell
A mechanoreceptor found in the skin involved in the sense of touch, particularly pressure and texture. Communicates with sensory neurons.

Mesencephalon
Also known as the midbrain, this region of the brainstem is involved in motor control, vision, hearing, and alertness.

Metabotropic receptor
A type of neurotransmitter receptor that activates a second messenger system via G-proteins, resulting in slower but longer-lasting cellular effects.

Microelectrode
A very fine electrode used to record the electrical activity of individual neurons.

Microglia
The resident immune cells of the central nervous system, responsible for clearing debris, responding to injury, and regulating inflammation.

Middle ear
The air-filled space containing the auditory ossicles (malleus, incus, stapes) that transmit sound from the outer ear to the inner ear.

Midbrain
A portion of the brainstem that includes structures such as the tectum and tegmentum. It plays roles in vision, hearing, motor control, and arousal.

Mismatch negativity (MMN)
An event-related potential detected via EEG that reflects automatic brain response to deviations in auditory stimuli. Used in studies of perception and schizophrenia.

Mitochondria
Organelles responsible for energy production in cells. In neurons, they play critical roles in metabolism, calcium regulation, and apoptosis.

Molecular layer
The outermost layer of the cerebellar cortex and cerebral cortex (in some regions), containing relatively few neurons and mostly dendrites, axons, and synapses.

Monoamine oxidase (MAO)
An enzyme that breaks down monoamine neurotransmitters such as dopamine, serotonin, and norepinephrine. Targeted by some antidepressants.

Monosynaptic reflex
A reflex arc that involves only one synapse between a sensory neuron and a motor neuron, such as the knee-jerk (patellar) reflex.

Mossy fiber
A type of excitatory input fiber to the cerebellum originating from the spinal cord and brainstem nuclei. They synapse onto granule cells.

Motor cortex
A region of the frontal lobe involved in planning, controlling, and executing voluntary movements.

Motor neuron
A type of neuron that transmits signals from the central nervous system to muscles or glands, enabling movement and action.

Motor unit
A motor neuron and all the muscle fibers it innervates. Varies in size depending on the precision required by the muscle.

MRI spectroscopy
A specialized MRI technique that measures concentrations of certain brain chemicals or metabolites, aiding in diagnosis of tumors and metabolic disorders.

Multisensory integration
The process by which the brain combines information from different sensory modalities (e.g., vision and sound) to create coherent perception.

Myelin
A fatty substance that insulates axons, increasing the speed and efficiency of action potential conduction. Formed by oligodendrocytes in the CNS and Schwann cells in the PNS.

Myelination
The process of forming a myelin sheath around axons, critical for normal neural function. Occurs progressively during development.

Myoclonus
Sudden, involuntary muscle jerks or twitches. Can be physiological (e.g., sleep starts) or associated with neurological disorders.

== N ==
N-acetylaspartate (NAA)
A molecule found predominantly in neurons, often measured via magnetic resonance spectroscopy as a marker of neuronal health and density.

Narcolepsy
A neurological disorder characterized by excessive daytime sleepiness, sudden sleep attacks, and sometimes cataplexy. It involves dysfunction in the brain's regulation of sleep–wake cycles.

Nasal cavity
The air passageway behind the nose that houses the olfactory epithelium, which contains sensory neurons responsible for detecting odors.

Neocortex
The largest part of the cerebral cortex, involved in higher-order brain functions such as sensory perception, motor commands, reasoning, and language.

Neologism
A newly coined word or expression. In neuropsychology, may refer to nonsensical or made-up words produced by individuals with certain types of aphasia.

Neostriatum
A subdivision of the basal ganglia comprising the caudate nucleus and putamen. It is involved in motor control and reward processing.

Neural crest
A group of embryonic cells that gives rise to various structures, including peripheral neurons, glia, and parts of the face and skull.

Neural oscillation
Rhythmic or repetitive electrical activity in the central nervous system, often observed as brain waves in EEG recordings.

Neural plasticity
The ability of the nervous system to change its structure and function in response to experience, injury, or development.

Neural stem cell
A self-renewing progenitor cell capable of generating neurons and glial cells. Found in the developing brain and certain adult brain regions such as the hippocampus.

Neurodegeneration
The progressive loss of structure or function of neurons, often leading to cell death. Seen in disorders such as Alzheimer’s disease and Parkinson’s disease.

Neurodevelopment
The biological processes through which the nervous system grows and matures, including neurogenesis, migration, synaptogenesis, and myelination.

Neuroeconomics
An interdisciplinary field that combines neuroscience, psychology, and economics to study decision-making and reward processing in the brain.

Neuroepithelial cell
A type of cell in the developing neural tube that gives rise to neural progenitor cells, which later differentiate into neurons and glia.

Neuroethology
The study of the neural basis of natural animal behavior, often involving model species and evolutionary comparisons.

Neurofilament
A type of intermediate filament found in neurons, important for maintaining cell shape and axonal transport.

Neurofibrillary tangle
A pathological hallmark of Alzheimer’s disease, composed of hyperphosphorylated tau protein that disrupts normal neuronal function.

Neurogenesis
The process by which new neurons are generated from neural stem or progenitor cells. Continues into adulthood in specific brain regions.

Neuroglia
Also known as glial cells, these support, protect, and nourish neurons. Types include astrocytes, oligodendrocytes, and microglia.

Neuroimaging
Techniques used to visualize the structure or function of the nervous system, including MRI, fMRI, PET, and EEG.

Neurologic examination
A systematic clinical assessment of motor, sensory, reflex, and cognitive function to diagnose disorders of the nervous system.

Neuromodulation
The physiological process by which a given neuron uses chemicals to regulate diverse populations of neurons. May be endogenous (e.g., dopamine) or externally applied via electrical stimulation.

Neuromodulator
A substance that alters the effectiveness of synaptic transmission without directly causing excitatory or inhibitory postsynaptic potentials. Examples include serotonin, acetylcholine, and norepinephrine.

Neuron
A specialized cell in the nervous system that transmits electrical and chemical signals. Composed of a cell body, axon, and dendrites.

Neuropil
A dense network of interwoven nerve fibers, dendrites, and glial processes where synaptic activity occurs, commonly found in the gray matter of the brain.

Neuroplasticity
See neural plasticity.

Neuroprosthetics
A field that develops devices that interface with the nervous system to restore lost function, such as cochlear implants or brain–computer interfaces.

Neuropsychiatry
A medical field combining aspects of neurology and psychiatry to treat disorders with both neurological and psychiatric components, such as OCD or Tourette syndrome.

Neuropsychology
The study of the relationship between brain function and behavior, often using cognitive testing and brain imaging to assess individuals with brain injury or disease.

Neuroscience
The scientific study of the nervous system, encompassing a wide range of disciplines from molecular biology and anatomy to behavior and cognition.

Neurosecretion
The release of signaling molecules (such as hormones) by specialized neurons, often into the bloodstream, as in the hypothalamus–pituitary gland axis.

Neurosteroids
Steroid molecules synthesized in the brain that modulate neuronal excitability and synaptic function, often via GABA and NMDA receptors.

Neurotransmitter
A chemical substance released at the end of a neuron’s axon that transmits a signal across a synapse to another cell. Examples include glutamate, dopamine, and serotonin.

Nodes of Ranvier
Regularly spaced gaps in the myelin sheath of axons that allow for saltatory conduction of action potentials.

Nociception
The sensory perception of pain, including detection of noxious stimuli and the signaling pathways that convey pain information to the brain.

Nucleus accumbens
A region of the basal forebrain involved in reward, pleasure, and addiction. Rich in dopamine and a key component of the brain's reward circuit.

Nystagmus
Rapid, involuntary eye movements that may be physiological or result from vestibular or neurological disorders.

== O ==
Obex
The point in the brainstem where the fourth ventricle narrows to become the central canal of the spinal cord. Used as an anatomical landmark in neuroanatomy.

Occipital lobe
The rearmost lobe of the cerebral cortex, primarily responsible for visual processing, including interpretation of color, motion, and spatial orientation.

Ocular dominance
A preference of neurons in the visual cortex for input from one eye over the other. Studied extensively in visual development and plasticity.

Oculomotor nerve (Cranial Nerve III)
A cranial nerve that controls most of the eye's movements, including those of the eyelid and pupil constriction. Damage may result in diplopia or ptosis.

Olfaction
The sense of smell, mediated by receptors in the olfactory epithelium and processed in the olfactory bulb and related brain regions.

Olfactory bulb
The first brain structure to process olfactory (smell) information. Receives input from sensory neurons in the nasal cavity and sends projections to the olfactory cortex and limbic system.

Olfactory cortex
A region of the brain involved in odor identification and perception. Includes the piriform cortex and parts of the amygdala and entorhinal cortex.

Olfactory nerve (Cranial Nerve I)
The first cranial nerve, responsible for transmitting smell information from the nose to the brain.

Oligodendrocyte
A type of glial cell in the central nervous system that forms the myelin sheath around axons, enabling rapid signal conduction.

Ontogeny
The development of an individual organism, particularly the growth and differentiation of the nervous system from embryo to adult.

Operculum (brain)
A part of the cerebral cortex that covers the insula. It includes portions of the frontal, temporal, and parietal lobes.

Opsin
A light-sensitive protein found in photoreceptor cells of the retina. Plays a key role in the molecular detection of light in vision.

Optic chiasm
The point at which the optic nerves from both eyes partially cross, allowing visual information from each eye to be processed in both hemispheres of the brain.

Optic nerve (Cranial Nerve II)
A cranial nerve that transmits visual information from the retina to the lateral geniculate nucleus of the thalamus.

Optic tract
The continuation of the optic nerve fibers after the optic chiasm; carries visual information to the thalamus and midbrain.

Optogenetics
A technique that uses light-sensitive proteins to control the activity of genetically targeted neurons. Widely used in neuroscience research to study circuit function.

Orbitofrontal cortex
A prefrontal brain region involved in decision-making, reward processing, and emotional regulation. Dysfunction is linked to addiction and impulsivity.

Organ of Corti
The sensory organ within the cochlea that contains hair cells and is responsible for converting sound vibrations into neural signals.

Orientation column
A vertical column of neurons in the visual cortex that respond to lines of the same orientation. Part of the brain’s system for processing visual features.

Oscillation
Repetitive rhythmic activity in neurons or neural networks. Neural oscillations, such as alpha waves and gamma waves, are observed in brain activity recordings.

Otolith organs
Structures in the vestibular system (the utricle and saccule) that detect linear acceleration and head position relative to gravity.

== P ==
Pacinian corpuscle
A type of rapidly adapting mechanoreceptor located deep in the skin, responsible for detecting vibration and pressure.

Pain
An unpleasant sensory and emotional experience associated with actual or potential tissue damage. In neuroscience, pain is studied through nociception, pain pathways, and perception.

Paralysis
The loss of voluntary muscle function, often caused by damage to the brain, spinal cord, or peripheral nerves.

Paraneoplastic syndrome
A rare disorder triggered by an immune response to cancer that affects the nervous system. Can lead to sensory, motor, or cognitive symptoms.

Parietal lobe
A region of the cerebral cortex located near the top and back of the brain, involved in processing somatosensory information, spatial orientation, and body awareness.

Parkinson’s disease
A neurodegenerative disorder characterized by tremors, rigidity, bradykinesia, and postural instability. Caused by loss of dopaminergic neurons in the substantia nigra.

Parvocellular pathway
A visual processing stream originating in small ganglion cells of the retina, responsible for high-acuity and color vision. Projects to the lateral geniculate nucleus.

Periaqueductal gray (PAG)
A midbrain region involved in pain modulation, defensive behavior, and autonomic regulation. Contains opioid receptors and descending pain control pathways.

Peripheral nervous system (PNS)
All nerves and ganglia outside the brain and spinal cord. It includes sensory and motor neurons as well as autonomic nerves.

Periventricular
Located near or surrounding the brain’s ventricular system. Often used to describe regions affected in diseases like multiple sclerosis.

PET scan (Positron Emission Tomography)
A neuroimaging technique that uses radioactive tracers to measure metabolic processes, often used to study brain activity, neurotransmitter systems, and disease progression.

Phantom limb
A phenomenon in which amputees feel sensations, including pain, in a limb that is no longer present. Thought to result from cortical reorganization.

Phenotype
The observable characteristics of an organism resulting from the interaction of its genotype with the environment. In neuroscience, may include behavioral traits, brain structure, or disease symptoms.

Phineas Gage
A famous historical case in neuroscience involving a railroad worker who survived a frontal lobe injury, providing early evidence of the brain’s role in personality and behavior.

Photoreceptor
A specialized neuron in the retina (rods and cones) that converts light into neural signals for visual processing.

Pia mater
The innermost of the three meninges surrounding the brain and spinal cord. It closely follows the contours of the brain surface.

Place cell
A neuron in the hippocampus that becomes active when an animal is in a specific location. Central to the brain’s internal spatial mapping system.

Plasticity
The brain's ability to adapt and reorganize itself through experience, learning, or following injury. See also neuroplasticity.

Pons
A structure in the brainstem that relays signals between the cerebrum and cerebellum, and plays roles in sleep, respiration, and facial sensation.

Postcentral gyrus
The gyrus in the parietal lobe that contains the primary somatosensory cortex, responsible for processing tactile information from the body.

Posterior parietal cortex
A region involved in integrating sensory information for spatial awareness and movement planning. Important in reaching and grasping tasks.

Postganglionic neuron
A neuron in the autonomic nervous system that extends from a ganglion to a target organ, influencing functions such as heart rate and digestion.

Postsynaptic potential
A change in membrane potential in a neuron following activation of synaptic receptors. Can be excitatory (EPSP) or inhibitory (IPSP).

Prefrontal cortex
The front part of the frontal lobe involved in decision-making, planning, social behavior, and personality. Highly developed in humans.

Presynaptic terminal
The end of an axon where neurotransmitters are released into the synaptic cleft following an action potential.

Primary motor cortex
A region in the frontal lobe responsible for initiating voluntary motor movements. Located in the precentral gyrus.

Primary somatosensory cortex
Located in the postcentral gyrus of the parietal lobe, it processes tactile and proprioceptive information from the body.

Prion
A misfolded protein that can cause other proteins to misfold, leading to neurodegenerative diseases such as Creutzfeldt–Jakob disease.

Procedural memory
A type of long-term memory for performing tasks and skills (e.g., riding a bike), often associated with the basal ganglia and cerebellum.

Prosopagnosia
A neurological disorder characterized by the inability to recognize faces, often due to damage in the fusiform face area.

Purkinje cell
A large, GABAergic neuron located in the cerebellar cortex. It has extensive dendritic branching and is essential for motor coordination.

Pyramidal cell
A type of excitatory neuron found in the cerebral cortex, especially the motor cortex. Named for its pyramid-shaped soma.

Pyramidal tract
A major motor pathway that transmits signals from the cerebral cortex to the spinal cord, enabling voluntary movement.

== Q ==
QEEG (Quantitative Electroencephalography)
A technique that analyzes EEG data using mathematical algorithms and statistical comparisons to identify abnormalities in brainwave activity. Used in research, clinical diagnostics, and neurofeedback.

Quadrantanopia
A type of partial vision loss affecting a quarter of the visual field, usually resulting from damage to the optic radiations or visual cortex.

Quadriplegia
Paralysis affecting all four limbs, often due to cervical spinal cord injury or disease. Also known as tetraplegia.

Quantal neurotransmitter release
The process by which neurotransmitters are released in discrete packets (quanta) from synaptic vesicles. Each quantum represents the contents of one vesicle.

Quiescent state
A resting or inactive phase of a neuron or glial cell in which there is minimal metabolic or electrical activity. Relevant in stem cell research and neuronal excitability.

Quinine
An alkaloid that blocks certain ion channels, including voltage-gated potassium channels. Used experimentally in neurophysiology and to treat malaria.

== R ==
Radial glial cell
A type of glial cell present during brain development that serves as a scaffold for migrating neurons and acts as a neural progenitor cell.

Rasmussen's encephalitis
A rare chronic inflammatory neurological disorder that typically affects one hemisphere of the brain, causing seizures, progressive weakness, and cognitive decline.

Receptor potential
A change in membrane potential in a sensory receptor cell in response to a stimulus. It may trigger action potentials in sensory neurons.

Receptor tyrosine kinase (RTK)
A class of receptors involved in cell growth and differentiation. In neuroscience, RTKs mediate responses to neurotrophic factors like BDNF and NGF.

Reelin
A protein involved in regulating neuronal migration and positioning during brain development. Disruption is associated with lissencephaly and schizophrenia.

Reflex
A rapid, automatic motor response to a stimulus, often mediated by the spinal cord without conscious brain involvement.

Refractory period
A brief period following an action potential during which a neuron is less excitable or unable to fire another action potential.

Relative refractory period
The phase during which a neuron can fire another action potential, but only with a stronger-than-normal stimulus. Follows the absolute refractory period.

REM sleep (Rapid Eye Movement sleep)
A sleep phase characterized by rapid eye movements, vivid dreams, muscle atonia, and heightened brain activity resembling wakefulness.

Resting membrane potential
The baseline electrical potential across the neuron's membrane when it is not actively sending signals, typically around –70 mV in neurons.

Reticular formation
A network of nuclei in the brainstem involved in regulating arousal, attention, sleep–wake cycles, and autonomic functions.

Retina
A thin layer of tissue at the back of the eye that contains photoreceptors and neurons responsible for detecting light and initiating visual processing.

Retinotopy
An orderly representation of the visual field maintained throughout the visual pathways, including the visual cortex.

Retrograde amnesia
A type of memory loss where individuals cannot recall past memories prior to a brain injury, while the ability to form new memories may be preserved.

Retrograde transport
The movement of materials from the axon terminal back to the cell body, typically via dynein motors. Used for recycling vesicles and transporting signals.

Rett syndrome
A rare neurodevelopmental disorder, primarily affecting females, caused by mutations in the MECP2 gene. Characterized by developmental regression, motor problems, and seizures.

Reuptake
The process by which neurotransmitters are reabsorbed by the presynaptic neuron after being released, terminating synaptic transmission.

Reward system
A group of brain structures involved in motivation, pleasure, and reinforcement. Includes the ventral tegmental area, nucleus accumbens, and prefrontal cortex.

Rhinal cortex
A region of the medial temporal lobe that plays a key role in memory and object recognition. Includes the perirhinal and entorhinal cortices.

Rhombencephalon
Also known as the hindbrain, this embryonic brain region gives rise to the pons, medulla oblongata, and cerebellum.

Ribosome
A cellular organelle responsible for protein synthesis. In neurons, local ribosome activity occurs in dendrites and axons, supporting synaptic plasticity.

Rostral
A directional term meaning “toward the nose” or front of the brain. Often used in anatomical descriptions of the central nervous system.

Ruffini ending
A slow-adapting mechanoreceptor found in the skin that detects skin stretch and contributes to proprioception and object manipulation.

RUNX1
A transcription factor involved in sensory neuron differentiation and pain signaling. Active during embryonic development and in peripheral nervous system patterning.

== S ==
Saltatory conduction
A process in which action potentials "jump" from one node of Ranvier to the next along a myelinated axon, greatly increasing conduction speed.

Schizophrenia
A severe mental disorder characterized by distortions in thinking, perception, emotions, and behavior. Associated with abnormalities in dopamine signaling and cortical connectivity.

Schwann cell
A type of glial cell in the peripheral nervous system that forms the myelin sheath around axons, aiding in rapid signal transmission.

Second messenger
A molecule generated inside a cell in response to a neurotransmitter or hormone binding to a receptor. Examples include cAMP, IP₃, and Ca²⁺.

Seizure
A sudden, uncontrolled electrical disturbance in the brain that can cause changes in behavior, movements, or consciousness.

Selective serotonin reuptake inhibitor (SSRI)
A class of antidepressants that increase serotonin levels in the synaptic cleft by blocking its reabsorption into the presynaptic neuron.

Semantic memory
A type of long-term memory involving general world knowledge, facts, and concepts, distinct from episodic memory.

Sensory neuron
A neuron that responds to external stimuli such as light, touch, sound, or chemical signals and transmits sensory information to the central nervous system.

Sensory cortex
A region of the cerebral cortex involved in processing incoming sensory information. Includes the primary somatosensory cortex and adjacent areas.

Sensory gating
A process by which the brain filters out redundant or unnecessary stimuli from all the sensory inputs, often studied in schizophrenia research.

Sensory map
An organized representation of sensory information in the brain. For example, the somatotopic map in the primary somatosensory cortex.

Serotonin
A neurotransmitter involved in mood, sleep, appetite, and cognition. Dysregulation of serotonin systems is linked to depression and anxiety disorders.

Short-term memory
The capacity to hold a small amount of information in an active, readily accessible state for a short period of time. Often contrasted with long-term memory.

Sleep spindle
A burst of oscillatory brain activity visible on an EEG during Stage 2 non-REM sleep. Thought to play a role in memory consolidation.

Somatic nervous system
A component of the peripheral nervous system responsible for voluntary control of body movements via skeletal muscles.

Somatosensory system
The part of the sensory system concerned with the conscious perception of touch, pressure, pain, temperature, position, movement, and vibration.

Spasticity
A condition of increased muscle tone (hypertonia) and exaggerated reflexes, often resulting from damage to upper motor neurons.

Spatial memory
The part of memory responsible for recording information about one’s environment and spatial orientation. Heavily dependent on the hippocampus.

Spike-timing-dependent plasticity (STDP)
A form of synaptic plasticity in which the timing of neuronal spikes determines whether synapses are strengthened or weakened.

Spinal cord
The part of the central nervous system housed within the vertebral column. It transmits signals between the brain and the rest of the body and controls reflexes.

Split-brain
A condition resulting from surgical severing of the corpus callosum, often performed to treat severe epilepsy. Reveals the functional specialization of brain hemispheres.

Stellate cell
A star-shaped neuron, often GABA-ergic, found in regions like the cerebellum and somatosensory cortex.

Stiles–Crawford effect
A phenomenon in visual perception where light rays entering the eye near the center of the pupil are more effective in eliciting a visual response than those entering near the edge.

Striatum
A major component of the basal ganglia, involved in movement, reward, and procedural learning. Composed of the caudate nucleus and putamen.

Stroke
A condition where poor blood flow to the brain results in cell death. Symptoms depend on the affected brain region and may include paralysis, speech impairment, and memory loss.

Subarachnoid space
The area between the arachnoid mater and the pia mater, filled with cerebrospinal fluid that cushions the brain and spinal cord.

Substantia nigra
A midbrain structure involved in movement and reward. Degeneration of dopaminergic neurons here leads to Parkinson's disease.

Sulcus
A groove on the surface of the cerebral cortex that separates adjacent gyri. Prominent sulci define major brain lobes and landmarks.

Superior colliculus
A structure in the midbrain involved in visual processing and control of eye movements. Part of the tectum.

Supplementary motor area
A region of the medial frontal cortex involved in the planning and coordination of complex, internally generated movements. The SMA contributes to motor sequence initiation, bimanual coordination, and motor imagery.

Synapse
The junction between two neurons (or between a neuron and another cell) where information is transmitted via neurotransmitters or electrical signals.

Synaptic cleft
The small space between the presynaptic and postsynaptic neurons across which neurotransmitters are released.

Synaptic plasticity
The ability of synapses to strengthen or weaken over time, based on activity levels. It underlies learning and memory.

Synaptogenesis
The formation of new synapses between neurons. It occurs extensively during development and continues throughout life in certain brain regions.

Synaptopathy
A disorder of synaptic function, often implicated in neurodevelopmental and neurodegenerative diseases such as autism and Alzheimer’s disease.

Syringomyelia
A condition in which a cyst forms within the spinal cord, potentially damaging nerve fibers and leading to pain, weakness, and sensory loss.

== T ==
Tactile agnosia
The inability to recognize objects by touch, despite intact somatosensation. Often results from lesions in the parietal lobe.

Tardive dyskinesia
A neurological disorder characterized by involuntary, repetitive movements, typically of the face or limbs. Often a side effect of long-term use of antipsychotic medications.

Tau protein
A microtubule-associated protein involved in stabilizing neuronal cytoskeletons. Abnormal tau aggregation is a hallmark of Alzheimer's disease and other tauopathies.

Tectum
The dorsal part of the midbrain, containing structures such as the superior colliculus and inferior colliculus, involved in visual and auditory reflexes.

Telencephalon
The anterior part of the forebrain that develops into the cerebral hemispheres. It contains the cerebral cortex, basal ganglia, and limbic system structures.

Temporal lobe
A lobe of the cerebral cortex involved in auditory processing, language comprehension, memory, and emotion.

Thalamus
A deep brain structure that serves as a major relay center, transmitting sensory and motor signals to the cerebral cortex. It also plays a role in consciousness and alertness.

Theta wave
A type of brainwave oscillation in the 4–8 Hz range, typically associated with light sleep, meditation, and memory encoding processes.

Third ventricle
A narrow cavity in the brain located between the two halves of the diencephalon, connected to the lateral and fourth ventricles and filled with cerebrospinal fluid.

Thoracic spinal cord
The portion of the spinal cord that corresponds to the thoracic vertebrae. It controls trunk muscles and part of the sympathetic nervous system.

Tonic receptor
A sensory receptor that continues to fire throughout the duration of a stimulus. Contrasts with phasic receptors, which adapt quickly.

Tonic-clonic seizure
A type of generalized seizure involving an initial tonic phase of muscle stiffening followed by a clonic phase of rhythmic jerking. Often accompanied by loss of consciousness.

Top-down processing
Perception driven by cognition — the brain applies what it knows and expects to what it sees. In contrast to bottom-up processing.

Transcranial direct current stimulation (tDCS)
A noninvasive brain stimulation technique that applies a low electrical current to the scalp to modulate neuronal excitability.

Transcranial magnetic stimulation (TMS)
A noninvasive method to stimulate or inhibit brain activity using magnetic fields. Used in both research and treatment for depression and other disorders.

Transduction
The process of converting a physical stimulus (e.g., light, sound, touch) into an electrical signal in sensory receptors.

Trigeminal nerve (Cranial Nerve V)
The largest cranial nerve, responsible for sensation in the face and motor control of biting and chewing.

Trophic factor
A substance, such as nerve growth factor (NGF), that supports the growth, survival, and differentiation of neurons.

Tuberomammillary nucleus
A small cluster of histaminergic neurons in the hypothalamus involved in arousal, attention, and the sleep–wake cycle.

Two-point discrimination
The ability to distinguish two closely spaced tactile stimuli as separate. Used to assess somatosensory function.

== U ==
Ultradian rhythm
A recurrent biological cycle that occurs more than once in 24 hours, such as stages of sleep. In neuroscience, it refers to shorter rhythms regulating hormonal release, arousal, or sleep cycles.

Unconditioned response
In classical conditioning, an automatic, reflexive response to an unconditioned stimulus (e.g., salivation to food). Studied in behavioral neuroscience.

Unconsciousness
A state in which an individual is not aware of themselves or their surroundings. Can result from head injury, anesthesia, or metabolic dysfunction.

Uncus
A structure on the medial surface of the temporal lobe, part of the parahippocampal gyrus. It is involved in olfaction and is adjacent to the amygdala.

Undershoot
The hyperpolarizing phase following an action potential where membrane potential temporarily becomes more negative than resting potential.

Unilateral neglect
A neuropsychological condition following damage (typically to the right parietal lobe) in which patients ignore stimuli on one side of space.

Unipolar depression
A mood disorder characterized by persistent low mood, lack of energy, and anhedonia, without manic episodes. Associated with altered activity in the prefrontal cortex and limbic structures.

Unipolar neuron
A type of neuron with a single process extending from the cell body. Common in invertebrates and found in human sensory neurons.

Upper motor neuron
A neuron originating in the cerebral cortex or brainstem that transmits motor signals to lower motor neurons. Damage leads to spasticity, hyperreflexia, and weakness.

Upregulation
An increase in the number or sensitivity of receptors on a neuron, often in response to reduced stimulation or drug exposure. A mechanism of plasticity.

Utricle
A structure within the vestibular system that detects linear acceleration and head position relative to gravity. Works in tandem with the saccule.

Uveitis
Inflammation of the uveal tract (including the iris, ciliary body, and choroid), which can cause visual disturbances and is sometimes associated with autoimmune neurological disorders.

== V ==
Vagus nerve
Cranial nerve X, responsible for parasympathetic control of the heart, lungs, and digestive tract. It also conveys sensory information from the viscera to the brainstem.

Vasopressin
Also known as antidiuretic hormone (ADH), it regulates water balance and blood pressure. In the brain, vasopressin influences social behavior and memory.

Ventral
A directional term meaning "toward the front" in the spinal cord or "toward the bottom" in the brain. Opposite of dorsal.

Ventral horn
The anterior portion of the spinal cord’s gray matter, containing motor neurons that project to skeletal muscles.

Ventral stream
A visual processing pathway ("what" pathway) that travels from the occipital lobe to the temporal lobe and is involved in object recognition and form representation.

Ventral tegmental area (VTA)
A midbrain structure containing dopaminergic neurons that project to the nucleus accumbens and prefrontal cortex, central to reward and motivation.

Ventricles
A set of interconnected cavities in the brain filled with cerebrospinal fluid (CSF), which cushions the brain and maintains intracranial pressure.

Vestibular system
The sensory system that contributes to balance, spatial orientation, and coordination of head and eye movements. Includes the semicircular canals and otolith organs.

Vestibulo-ocular reflex (VOR)
A reflex that stabilizes vision by producing eye movements in the opposite direction of head movement, allowing steady gaze.

Vesicle
A small membrane-bound structure within neurons that stores and releases neurotransmitters into the synaptic cleft during synaptic transmission.

Vesicular transport
The process by which neurotransmitters are packaged into synaptic vesicles and transported to the axon terminal for release.

Visual cortex
The region of the cerebral cortex responsible for processing visual information. Includes primary visual cortex (V1) and surrounding higher-order visual areas.

Visual field
The entire area that can be seen when the eyes are fixed in one position. Deficits in specific areas of the visual field are used to localize brain lesions.

Volition
The cognitive process of making decisions or initiating voluntary movements. Involves the prefrontal cortex and supplementary motor area.

Voxel-based morphometry
A neuroimaging analysis technique that compares local concentrations of brain tissue (e.g., gray matter) across individuals using MRI data.

== W ==
Wada test
A procedure used to determine language and memory functions in each hemisphere of the brain. It involves anesthetizing one hemisphere at a time, usually with sodium amobarbital, and is commonly performed prior to epilepsy surgery.

Wallerian degeneration
A process of degeneration that occurs in an axon distal to the site of injury. It is a key feature of nerve damage in both the central and peripheral nervous systems.

Waxy flexibility
A psychomotor symptom often associated with catatonia and schizophrenia in which a patient’s limbs remain in a fixed position after being moved by someone else.

Weber–Fechner law
A principle in sensory neuroscience that describes the relationship between the magnitude of a physical stimulus and the perceived intensity. Suggests logarithmic scaling of sensation.

Wernicke's area
A region of the posterior superior temporal gyrus in the dominant hemisphere, involved in language comprehension. Damage here causes Wernicke’s aphasia, which impairs understanding of spoken and written language.

Wernicke's encephalopathy
A neurological condition caused by thiamine deficiency, typically seen in chronic alcoholics. It manifests with a triad of symptoms: confusion, ataxia, and ophthalmoplegia.

West syndrome
A severe form of epilepsy in infancy characterized by infantile spasms, developmental regression, and a distinctive EEG pattern called hypsarrhythmia.

White matter
Tissue in the brain and spinal cord composed primarily of myelinated axons, facilitating communication between gray matter regions. Plays a central role in signal transmission speed and integration.

White matter hyperintensities
Lesions seen on MRI as bright spots in the brain's white matter, often associated with aging, vascular disease, and cognitive decline.

Wilson's disease
A rare genetic disorder involving impaired copper metabolism that leads to copper buildup in the brain, liver, and other tissues. Neurological symptoms include tremors, dystonia, and psychiatric changes.

Wolfram syndrome
A rare genetic disorder involving diabetes insipidus, diabetes mellitus, optic atrophy, and deafness (DIDMOAD). Associated with neurodegeneration and mitochondrial dysfunction.

Working memory
A form of short-term memory that allows temporary storage and manipulation of information necessary for tasks like reasoning and comprehension. Often localized to the dorsolateral prefrontal cortex.

Wrist drop
A neurological condition caused by radial nerve damage, resulting in an inability to extend the wrist and fingers. Often associated with nerve compression or trauma.

== X ==
X-chromosome inactivation
A process in female mammals where one of the two X chromosomes is randomly silenced in each cell to balance gene dosage with males. Some neurological disorders, such as Rett syndrome, are influenced by X-inactivation patterns.

X-linked adrenoleukodystrophy
A genetic disorder affecting the breakdown of very-long-chain fatty acids, leading to their accumulation in the brain and adrenal glands. It causes progressive demyelination and adrenal insufficiency.

X-linked intellectual disability
A group of inherited cognitive disorders associated with mutations on the X chromosome. Examples include Fragile X syndrome and MECP2 duplication syndrome.

Xenon (anesthetic)
A noble gas with neuroprotective and anesthetic properties. It has been studied for its NMDA receptor antagonism and minimal side effects on brain function.

Xenotransplantation
The transplantation of cells or tissues from one species to another for research or therapeutic purposes. In neuroscience, fetal pig or rat neural cells may be studied in primate models to investigate brain repair.

Xerostomia
A condition of dry mouth that may result from neurological disorders affecting autonomic control of salivary glands, such as Parkinson's disease or side effects of anticholinergic drugs.

== Y ==
Yawn
A reflex consisting of the simultaneous inhalation of air and stretching of the eardrums, followed by exhalation. Neurologically, yawning is linked to arousal, social communication, and thermoregulation of the brain.

Yerkes–Dodson law
A psychological principle describing the relationship between arousal and performance, suggesting that moderate arousal optimizes cognitive and motor performance. Widely referenced in neuroscience of stress and motivation.

Y chromosome microdeletion (YCM)
A genetic deletion on the Y chromosome that can affect brain development and function. Though rare, YCMs have been linked to neurodevelopmental conditions and fertility-related hormonal regulation.

Yohimbine
A plant-derived alkaloid and alpha-2 adrenergic receptor antagonist. In neuroscience research, it is used to model anxiety and stress responses in animals and humans.

Young–Helmholtz theory
A theory of trichromatic color vision proposing that the human eye perceives color through the relative activity of three types of photoreceptors sensitive to red, green, and blue light. Supported by modern neuroscience of vision.

== Z ==
Z-drugs
A class of non-benzodiazepine medications (e.g., zolpidem, zaleplon, eszopiclone) used to treat insomnia. They act as GABA_A receptor agonists and influence sleep architecture.

Zellweger syndrome
A rare congenital disorder caused by peroxisomal dysfunction, affecting brain development, myelination, and motor function. Symptoms include hypotonia, seizures, and impaired neuronal migration.

Zona incerta
A small region of gray matter in the subthalamus involved in sensorimotor integration, attention, and limbic functions. Its precise role remains under investigation.

Zygosity
The genetic relationship between alleles. In neuroscience research, zygosity is important in twin studies exploring heritability of traits like intelligence, brain volume, and psychiatric disorders.

== See also ==
- Outline of neuroscience
- Neuroscience
- List of neuroscience journals
- List of biological topics
- Glossary of biology
- Glossary of medicine
