= Nanoneuroscience =

Interdisciplinary field that integrates nanotechnology and neuroscience

Nanoneuroscience is an interdisciplinary field that integrates nanotechnology and neuroscience. One of its main goals is to gain a detailed understanding of how the nervous system operates and, thus, how neurons organize themselves in the brain. Consequently, creating drugs and devices that are able to cross the blood brain barrier (BBB) are essential to allow for detailed imaging and diagnoses. The blood brain barrier functions as a highly specialized semipermeable membrane surrounding the brain, preventing harmful molecules that may be dissolved in the circulation blood from entering the central nervous system.

The main two hurdles for drug-delivering molecules to access the brain are size (must have a molecular weight < 400 Da) and lipid solubility. Physicians hope to circumvent difficulties in accessing the central nervous system through viral gene therapy. This often involves direct injection into the patient's brain or cerebral spinal fluid. The drawback of this therapy is that it is invasive and carries a high risk factor due to the necessity of surgery for the treatment to be administered. Because of this, only 3.6% of clinical trials in this field have progressed to stage III since the concept of gene therapy was developed in the 1980s.

Another proposed way to cross the BBB is through temporary intentional disruption of the barrier. This method was first inspired by certain pathological conditions that were discovered to break down this barrier by themselves, such as Alzheimer's disease, Parkinson's disease, stroke, and seizure conditions.

== Nanoparticles ==
Nanoparticles are unique from macromolecules because their surface properties are dependent on their size, allowing for strategic manipulation of these properties (or, "programming") by scientists that would not be possible otherwise. Likewise, nanoparticle shape can also be varied to give a different set of characteristics based on the surface area to volume ratio of the particle.

Nanoparticles have promising therapeutic effects when treating neurodegenerative diseases. Oxygen reactive polymer (ORP) is a nano-platform programmed to react with oxygen and has been shown to detect and reduce the presence of reactive oxygen species (ROS) formed immediately after traumatic brain injuries. Nanoparticles have also been employed as a "neuroprotective" measure, as is the case with Alzheimer's disease and stroke models. Alzheimer's disease results in toxic aggregates of the amyloid beta protein formed in the brain. In one study, gold nanoparticles were programmed to attach themselves to these aggregates and were successful in breaking them up. Likewise, with ischemic stroke models, cells in the affected region of the brain undergo apoptosis, dramatically reducing blood flow to important parts of the brain and often resulting in death or severe mental and physical changes. Platinum nanoparticles have been shown to act as ROS, serving as "biological antioxidants" and significantly reducing oxidation in the brain as a result of stroke. Nanoparticles can also lead to neurotoxicity and cause permanent BBB damage either from brain oedema or from unrelated molecules crossing the BBB and causing brain damage. This proves further long term in vivo studies are needed to gain enough understanding to allow for successful clinical trials.

One of the most common nano-based drug delivery platforms is liposome-based delivery. They are both lipid-soluble and nano-scale and thus are permitted through a fully functioning BBB. Additionally, lipids themselves are biological molecules, making them highly biocompatible, which in turn lowers the risk of cell toxicity. The bilayer that is formed allows the molecule to fully encapsulate any drug, protecting it while it is travelling through the body. One drawback to shielding the drug from the outside cells is that it no longer has specificity, and requires coupling to extra antibodies to be able to target a biological site. Due to their low stability, liposome-based nanoparticles for drug delivery have a short shelf life.

Targeted therapy using magnetic nanoparticles (MNPs) is also a popular topic of research and has led to several stage III clinical trials. Invasiveness is not an issue here because a magnetic force can be applied from the outside of a patient's body to interact and direct the MNPs. This strategy has been proven successful in delivering brain-derived neurotropic factor, a naturally occurring gene thought to promote neurorehabilitation, across the BBB.

== Nano-imaging tools ==
The visualization of neuronal activity is of key importance in neuroscience. Nano-imaging tools with nanoscale resolution help in these areas. These optical imaging tools are PALM and STORM which helps visualize nanoscale objects within cells. So far, these imaging tools revealed the dynamic behavior and organization of the actin cytoskeleton inside the cells, which will assist in understanding how neurons probe their involvement during neuronal outgrowth and in response to injury, and how they differentiate axonal processes and characterization of receptor clustering and stoichiometry at the plasma inside the synapses, which are critical for understanding how synapses respond to changes in neuronal activity. These past works focused on devices for stimulation or inhibition of neural activity, but the crucial aspect is the ability for the device to simultaneously monitor neural activity. The major aspect that is to be improved in the nano imaging tools is the effective collection of the light as a major problem is that biological tissue are dispersive media that do not allow a straightforward propagation and control of light. These devices use nanoneedle and nanowire for probing and stimulation.

== Nanowires ==
Nanowires are artificial nano- or micro-sized "needles" that can provide high-fidelity electrophysiological recordings if used as microscopic electrodes for neuronal recordings. Nanowires are an attractive as they are highly functional structures that offer unique electronic properties that are affected by biological/chemical species adsorbed on their surface; mostly the conductivity. This conductivity variance depending on chemical species present allows enhanced sensing performances. Nanowires are also able to act as non-invasive and highly local probes. These versatility of nanowires makes it optimal for interfacing with neurons due to the fact that the contact length along the axon (or the dendrite projection crossing a nanowires) is just about 20 nm.
