= Neuroscience =

Scientific study of the nervous system

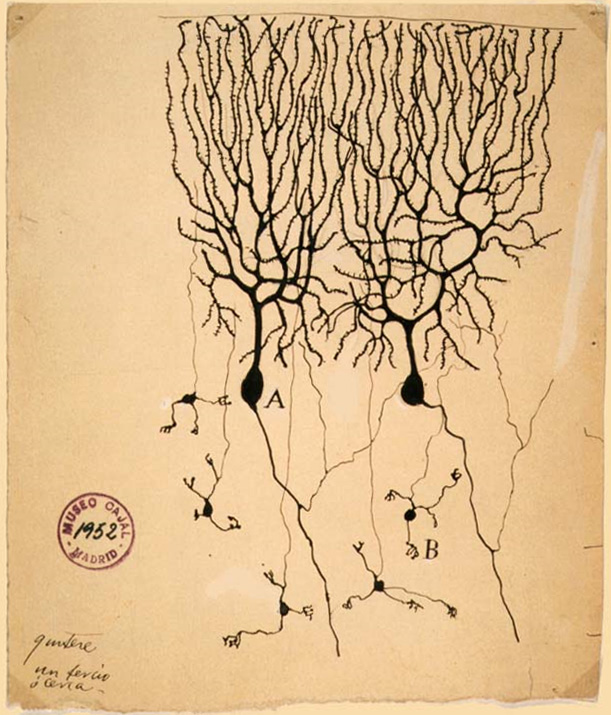
Drawing by Santiago Ramón y Cajal (1899) of neurons in the pigeon cerebellum

Neuroscience is the scientific study of the nervous system (the brain, spinal cord, and peripheral nervous system), its functions, and its disorders. It is a multidisciplinary science that combines physiology, anatomy, molecular biology, developmental biology, cytology, psychology, physics, computer science, chemistry, medicine, statistics, and mathematical modeling to understand the fundamental and emergent properties of neurons, glia, and neural circuits. The understanding of the biological basis of learning, memory, behavior, perception, and consciousness has been described by Eric Kandel as the "epic challenge" of the biological sciences.

The scope of neuroscience has broadened over time to include different approaches used to study the nervous system at different scales. The techniques used by neuroscientists have expanded enormously, from molecular and cellular studies of individual neurons to imaging of sensory, motor, and cognitive tasks in the brain.

== History ==
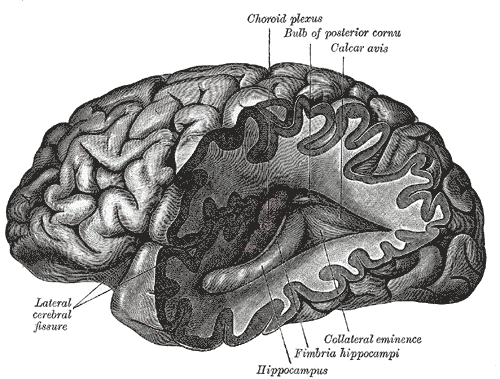
Illustration from Gray's Anatomy (1918) of a lateral view of the human brain, featuring the hippocampus among other neuroanatomical features

The earliest study of the nervous system dates to ancient Egypt. Trepanation, the surgical practice of either drilling or scraping a hole into the skull for the purpose of curing head injuries or mental disorders, or relieving cranial pressure, was first recorded during the Neolithic period. Manuscripts dating to 1700 BC indicate that the Egyptians had some knowledge about symptoms of brain damage.

Early views on the function of the brain regarded it as a ‘cranial stuffing' of sorts. In Egypt, from the late Middle Kingdom onwards, the brain was regularly removed in preparation for mummification. It was believed at the time that the heart was the seat of intelligence. According to Herodotus, the first step of mummification was to "take a crooked piece of iron, and with it draw out the brain through the nostrils, thus getting rid of a portion, while the skull is cleared of the rest by rinsing with drugs."

Greek thinkers, beginning with Alcmaeon of Croton, advanced the cephalocentric hypothesis that the brain is the seat of sensation and thought. The view that the heart was the source of consciousness was not challenged until the time of the Greek physician Hippocrates. He believed that the brain was not only involved with sensation—since most specialized organs (e.g., eyes, ears, tongue) are located in the head near the brain—but was also the seat of intelligence. Plato also speculated that the brain was the seat of the rational part of the soul. Aristotle, however, believed the heart was the center of intelligence and that the brain regulated the amount of heat from the heart. This view was generally accepted until the Roman physician Galen, a follower of Hippocrates and physician to Roman gladiators, observed that his patients lost their mental faculties when they had sustained damage to their brains.

Abulcasis, Averroes, Avicenna, Avenzoar, and Maimonides, active in the Medieval Muslim world, described a number of medical problems related to the brain. In Renaissance Europe, Vesalius (1514–1564), René Descartes (1596–1650), Thomas Willis (1621–1675) and Jan Swammerdam (1637–1680) also made several contributions to neuroscience.

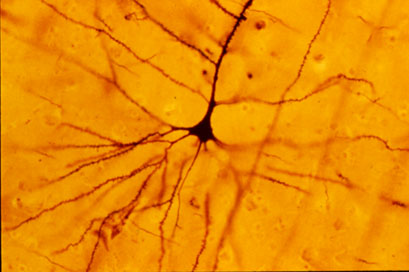
The Golgi stain first allowed for the visualization of individual neurons.

Luigi Galvani's pioneering work in the late 1700s set the stage for studying the electrical excitability of muscles and neurons. In 1843 Emil du Bois-Reymond demonstrated the electrical nature of the nerve signal, whose speed Hermann von Helmholtz proceeded to measure, and in 1875 Richard Caton found electrical phenomena in the cerebral hemispheres of rabbits and monkeys. Adolf Beck published in 1890 similar observations of spontaneous electrical activity of the brain of rabbits and dogs. Studies of the brain became more sophisticated after the invention of the microscope and the development of a staining procedure by Camillo Golgi during the late 1890s. The procedure used a silver chromate salt to reveal the intricate structures of individual neurons. His technique was used by Santiago Ramón y Cajal and led to the formation of the neuron doctrine, the hypothesis that the functional unit of the brain is the neuron. Golgi and Ramón y Cajal shared the Nobel Prize in Physiology or Medicine in 1906 for their extensive observations, descriptions, and categorizations of neurons throughout the brain.

In parallel with this research, in 1815 Jean Pierre Flourens induced localized lesions of the brain in living animals to observe their effects on motricity, sensibility and behavior. Work with brain-damaged patients by Marc Dax in 1836 and Paul Broca in 1865 suggested that certain regions of the brain were responsible for certain functions. At the time, these findings were seen as a confirmation of Franz Joseph Gall's theory that language was localized and that certain psychological functions were localized in specific areas of the cerebral cortex. The localization of function hypothesis was supported by observations of epileptic patients conducted by John Hughlings Jackson, who correctly inferred the organization of the motor cortex by watching the progression of seizures through the body. Carl Wernicke further developed the theory of the specialization of specific brain structures in language comprehension and production. In 1894, neurologist and psychiatrist Edward Flatau published a human brain atlas "Atlas of the Human Brain and the Course of the Nerve-Fibres" which consisted of long-exposure photographs of fresh brain sections. In 1897, Charles Scott Sherrington introduced the name "synapse" for the connection between neurons.

Brodmann's diagram of the cerebral cortex with the areas he identified

In 1909, German anatomist Korbinian Brodmann published his original research on brain mapping, defining 52 distinct regions of the cerebral cortex, known as Brodmann areas. Modern research through neuroimaging techniques, still uses the Brodmann cerebral cytoarchitectonic map (referring to the study of cell structure) anatomical definitions from this era in continuing to show that distinct areas of the cortex are activated in the execution of specific tasks.

During the 20th century, neuroscience began to be recognized as a distinct academic discipline in its own right, rather than as studies of the nervous system within other disciplines. Eric Kandel and collaborators have cited David Rioch, Francis O. Schmitt, and Stephen Kuffler as having played critical roles in establishing the field. Rioch originated the integration of basic anatomical and physiological research with clinical psychiatry at the Walter Reed Army Institute of Research, starting in the 1950s. During the same period, Schmitt established a neuroscience research program within the Biology Department at the Massachusetts Institute of Technology, bringing together biology, chemistry, physics, and mathematics. The first freestanding neuroscience department (then called Psychobiology) was founded in 1964 at the University of California, Irvine by James L. McGaugh. This was followed by the Department of Neurobiology at Harvard Medical School, which was founded in 1966 by Stephen Kuffler.

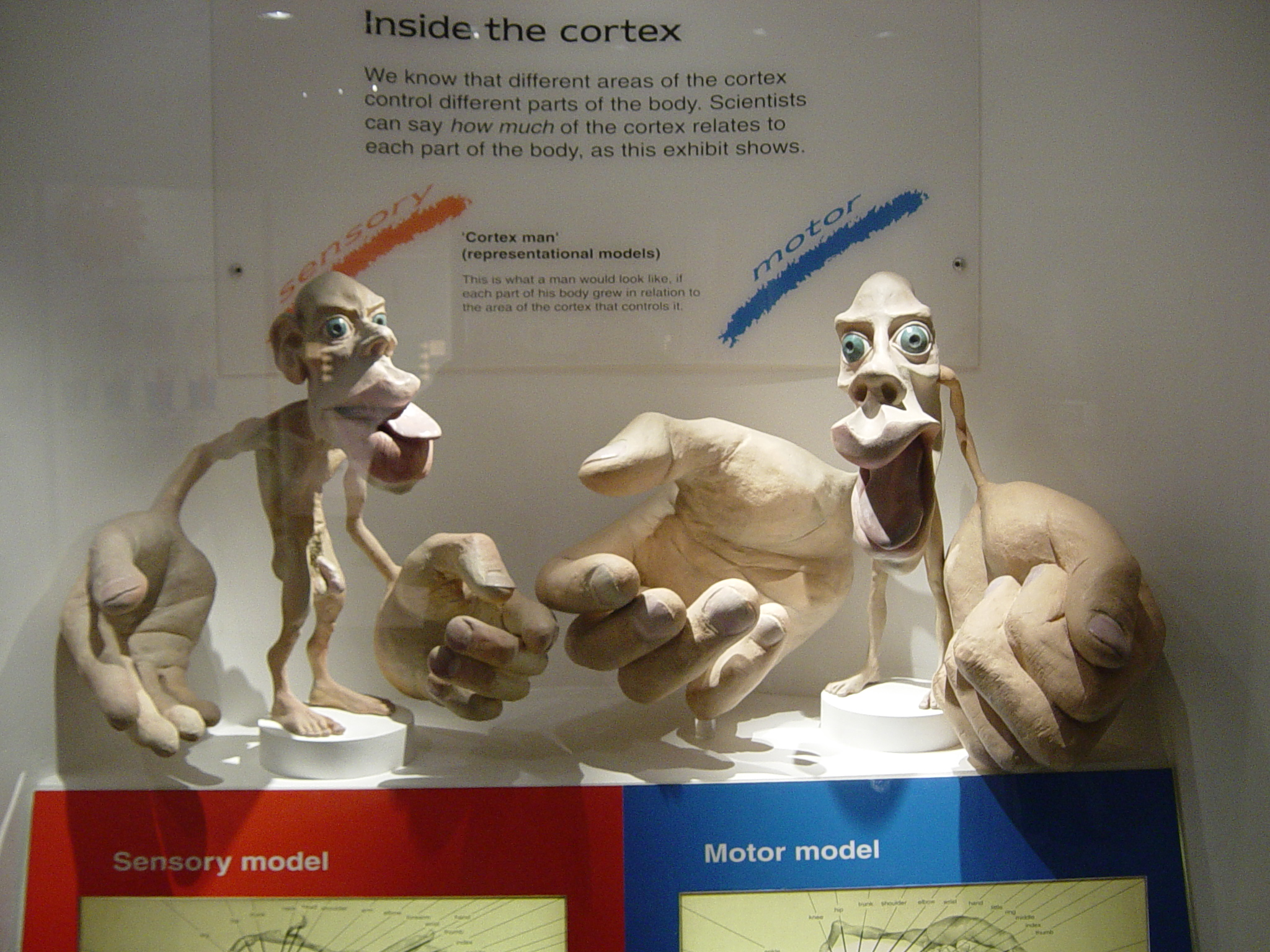
3-D sensory and motor homunculus models at the Natural History Museum, London

In the process of treating epilepsy, Wilder Penfield produced maps of the location of various functions (motor, sensory, memory, vision) in the brain. He summarized his findings in a 1950 book called The Cerebral Cortex of Man. Wilder Penfield and his co-investigators Edwin Boldrey and Theodore Rasmussen are considered to be the originators of the cortical homunculus.

The understanding of neurons and of nervous system function became increasingly precise and molecular during the 20th century. For example, in 1952, Alan Lloyd Hodgkin and Andrew Huxley presented a mathematical model for the transmission of electrical signals in neurons of the giant axon of a squid, which they called "action potentials", and how they are initiated and propagated, known as the Hodgkin–Huxley model. In 1961–1962, Richard FitzHugh and J. Nagumo simplified Hodgkin–Huxley, in what is called the FitzHugh–Nagumo model. In 1962, Bernard Katz modeled neurotransmission across the space between neurons known as synapses. Beginning in 1966, Eric Kandel and collaborators examined biochemical changes in neurons associated with learning and memory storage in Aplysia. In 1981 Catherine Morris and Harold Lecar combined these models in the Morris–Lecar model. Such increasingly quantitative work gave rise to numerous biological neuron models and models of neural computation.

As a result of the increasing interest in the nervous system, several prominent neuroscience organizations have been formed to provide a forum to all neuroscientists during the 20th century. For example, the International Brain Research Organization was founded in 1961, the International Society for Neurochemistry in 1963, the European Brain and Behaviour Society in 1968, and the Society for Neuroscience in 1969. Recently, the application of neuroscience research results has also given rise to applied disciplines as neuroeconomics, neuroeducation, neuroethics, and neurolaw.

Over time, brain research has gone through philosophical, experimental, and theoretical phases, with work on neural implants and brain simulation predicted to be important in the future.

== Modern neuroscience ==
Human nervous system

The scientific study of the nervous system increased significantly during the second half of the twentieth century, principally due to advances in molecular biology, electrophysiology, and computational neuroscience. This has allowed neuroscientists to study the nervous system in all its aspects: how it is structured, how it works, how it develops, how it malfunctions, and how it can be changed. Compared to psychiatry and psychology, which also study the functioning of the brain, Neuroscience emerged from the earlier fields of Neuro-Immuno-Modulation and Neuroimmunology, which made remarkable breakthroughs beginning with 1945.

For example, it became possible to understand the complex processes in greater detail occurring within a single neuron. Neurons are cells specialized for communication. They are able to communicate with neurons and other cell types through specialized junctions called synapses, at which electrical or electrochemical signals can be transmitted from one cell to another. Many neurons extrude a long thin filament of axoplasm called an axon, which may extend to distant parts of the body and is capable of rapidly carrying electrical signals, influencing the activity of other neurons, muscles, or glands at their termination points. A nervous system emerges from the assemblage of neurons that are connected to each other in neural circuits, and networks.

The vertebrate nervous system can be split into two parts: the central nervous system (defined as the brain and spinal cord), and the peripheral nervous system. In many species—including all vertebrates—the nervous system is the most complex organ system in the body, with most of the complexity residing in the brain. The human brain alone contains around one hundred billion neurons and one hundred trillion synapses; it consists of thousands of distinguishable substructures, connected to each other in synaptic networks whose intricacies have only begun to be unraveled. At least one out of three of the approximately 20,000 genes belonging to the human genome is expressed mainly in the brain.

Due to the high degree of plasticity of the human brain, the structure of its synapses and their resulting functions change throughout life.

Making sense of the nervous system's dynamic complexity is a formidable research challenge. Ultimately, neuroscientists would like to understand every aspect of the nervous system, including how it works, how it develops, how it malfunctions, and how it can be altered or repaired. Analysis of the nervous system is therefore performed at multiple levels, ranging from the molecular and cellular levels to the systems and cognitive levels. The specific topics that form the main focus of research change over time, driven by an ever-expanding base of knowledge and the availability of increasingly sophisticated technical methods. Improvements in technology have been the primary drivers of progress. Developments in electron microscopy, computer science, electronics, functional neuroimaging, and genetics and genomics have all been major drivers of progress.

Advances in the classification of brain cells have been enabled by electrophysiological recording, single-cell genetic sequencing, and high-quality microscopy, which have combined into a single method pipeline called patch-sequencing in which all three methods are simultaneously applied using miniature tools. The efficiency of this method and the large amounts of data that is generated has allowed researchers to make some general conclusions about cell types; for example that the human and mouse brain have different versions of fundamentally the same cell types.

=== Molecular and cellular neuroscience ===
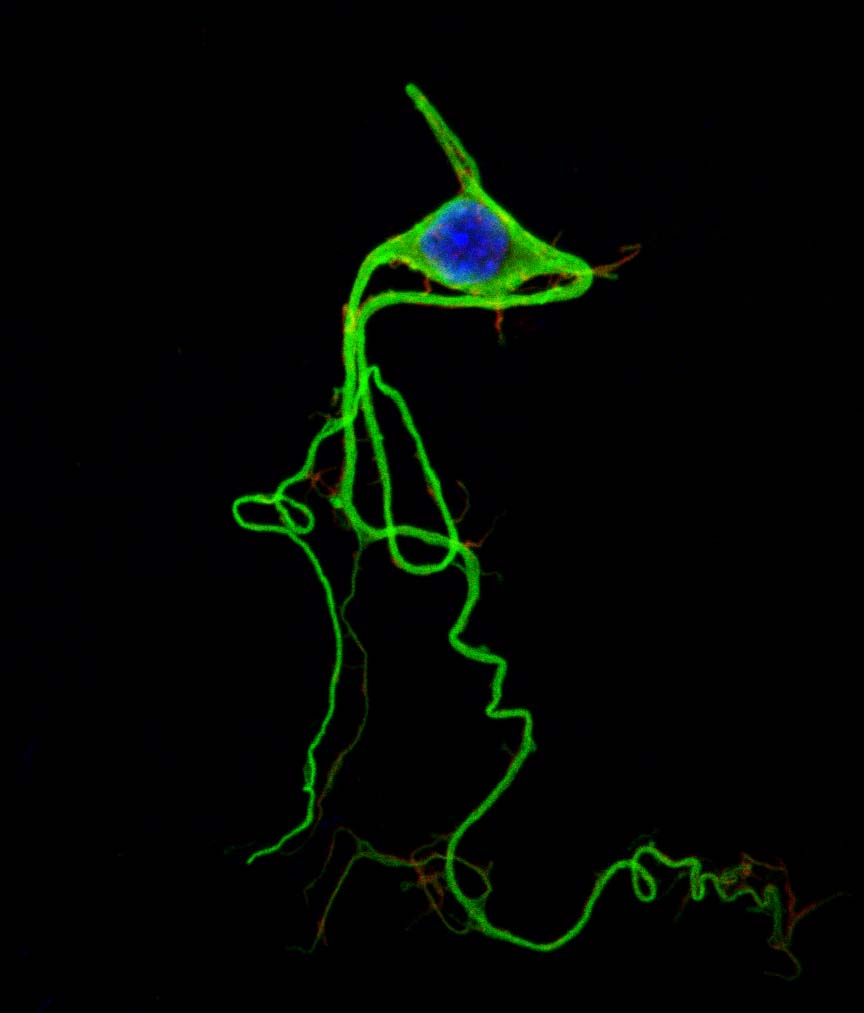
Photograph of a stained neuron in a chicken embryo

Basic questions addressed in molecular neuroscience include the mechanisms by which neurons express and respond to molecular signals and how axons form complex connectivity patterns. At this level, tools from molecular biology and genetics are used to understand how neurons develop and how genetic changes affect biological functions. The morphology, molecular identity, and physiological characteristics of neurons and how they relate to different types of behavior are also of considerable interest.

Questions addressed in cellular neuroscience include the mechanisms of how neurons process signals physiologically and electrochemically. These questions include how signals are processed by neurites and somas and how neurotransmitters and electrical signals are used to process information in a neuron. Neurites are thin extensions from a neuronal cell body, consisting of dendrites (specialized to receive synaptic inputs from other neurons) and axons (specialized to conduct nerve impulses called action potentials). Somas are the cell bodies of the neurons and contain the nucleus.

Another major area of cellular neuroscience is the investigation of the development of the nervous system. Questions include the patterning and regionalization of the nervous system, axonal and dendritic development, trophic interactions, synapse formation and the implication of fractones in neural stem cells, differentiation of neurons and glia (neurogenesis and gliogenesis), and neuronal migration.

Computational neurogenetic modeling is concerned with the development of dynamic neuronal models for modeling brain functions with respect to genes and dynamic interactions between genes, on the cellular level (Computational Neurogenetic Modeling (CNGM) can also be used to model neural systems).

=== Neural circuits and systems ===
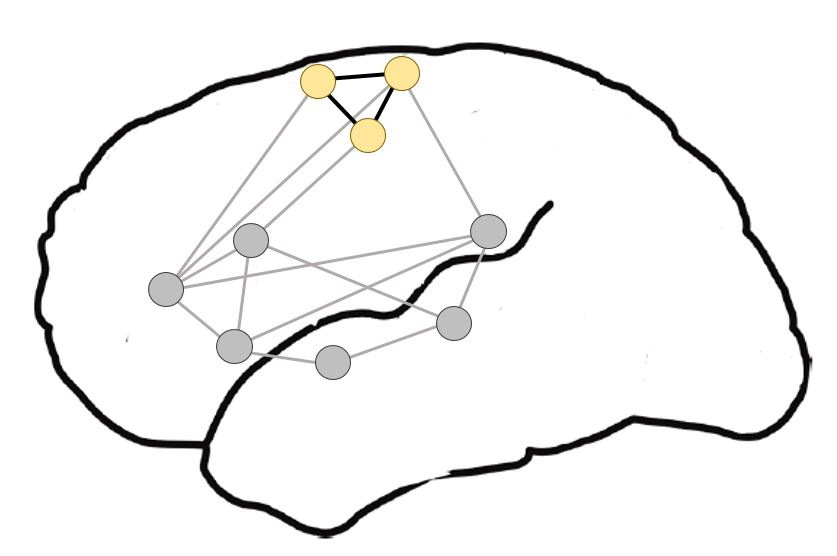
Proposed organization of motor-semantic neural circuits for action language comprehension. Adapted from Shebani et al. (2013).

Systems neuroscience research centers on the structural and functional architecture of the developing human brain, and the functions of large-scale brain networks, or functionally-connected systems within the brain. Alongside brain development, systems neuroscience also focuses on how the structure and function of the brain enables or restricts the processing of sensory information, using learned mental models of the world, to motivate behavior.

Questions in systems neuroscience include how neural circuits are formed and used anatomically and physiologically to produce functions such as reflexes, multisensory integration, motor coordination, circadian rhythms, emotional responses, learning, and memory. In other words, this area of research studies how connections are made and morphed in the brain, and the effect it has on human sensation, movement, attention, inhibitory control, decision-making, reasoning, memory formation, reward, and emotion regulation.

Specific areas of interest for the field include observations of how the structure of neural circuits effect skill acquisition, how specialized regions of the brain develop and change (neuroplasticity), and the development of brain atlases, or wiring diagrams of individual developing brains.

The related fields of neuroethology and neuropsychology address the question of how neural substrates underlie specific animal and human behaviors. Neuroendocrinology and psychoneuroimmunology examine interactions between the nervous system and the endocrine and immune systems, respectively. Despite many advancements, the way that networks of neurons perform complex cognitive processes and behaviors is still poorly understood.

=== Cognitive and behavioral neuroscience ===
Cognitive neuroscience addresses the questions of how psychological functions are produced by neural circuitry. The emergence of powerful new measurement techniques such as neuroimaging (e.g., fMRI, PET, SPECT), EEG, MEG, electrophysiology, optogenetics and human genetic analysis combined with sophisticated experimental techniques from cognitive psychology allows neuroscientists and psychologists to address abstract questions such as how cognition and emotion are mapped to specific neural substrates. Although many studies hold a reductionist stance looking for the neurobiological basis of cognitive phenomena, recent research shows that there is an interplay between neuroscientific findings and conceptual research, soliciting and integrating both perspectives. For example, neuroscience research on empathy solicited an interdisciplinary debate involving philosophy, psychology and psychopathology. Moreover, the neuroscientific identification of multiple memory systems related to different brain areas has challenged the idea of memory as a literal reproduction of the past, supporting a view of memory as a generative, constructive and dynamic process.

Neuroscience is also allied with the social and behavioral sciences, as well as with nascent interdisciplinary fields. Examples of such alliances include neuroeconomics, decision theory, social neuroscience, and neuromarketing to address complex questions about interactions of the brain with its environment. A study into consumer responses for example uses EEG to investigate neural correlates associated with narrative transportation into stories about energy efficiency.

=== Computational neuroscience ===
Questions in computational neuroscience can span a wide range of levels of traditional analysis, such as development, structure, and cognitive functions of the brain. Research in this field utilizes mathematical models, theoretical analysis, and computer simulation to describe and verify biologically plausible neurons and nervous systems. For example, biological neuron models are mathematical descriptions of spiking neurons which can be used to describe both the behavior of single neurons as well as the dynamics of neural networks. Computational neuroscience is often referred to as theoretical neuroscience.

=== Neuroscience and medicine ===
==== Clinical neuroscience ====
Neurology, psychiatry, neurosurgery, psychosurgery, anesthesiology and pain medicine, neuropathology, neuroradiology, ophthalmology, otolaryngology, clinical neurophysiology, addiction medicine, and sleep medicine are some medical specialties that specifically address the diseases of the nervous system. These terms also refer to clinical disciplines involving diagnosis and treatment of these diseases.

Neurology works with diseases of the central and peripheral nervous systems, such as amyotrophic lateral sclerosis (ALS) and stroke, and their medical treatment. Psychiatry focuses on affective, behavioral, cognitive, and perceptual disorders. Anesthesiology focuses on perception of pain, and pharmacologic alteration of consciousness. Neuropathology focuses upon the classification and underlying pathogenic mechanisms of central and peripheral nervous system and muscle diseases, with an emphasis on morphologic, microscopic, and chemically observable alterations. Neurosurgery and psychosurgery work primarily with surgical treatment of diseases of the central and peripheral nervous systems.

Neuroscience underlies the development of various neurotherapy methods to treat diseases of the nervous system.

==== Translational research ====
An MRI of a human head showing benign familial macrocephaly (head circumference > 60 cm)

Recently, the boundaries between various specialties have blurred, as they are all influenced by basic research in neuroscience. For example, brain imaging enables objective biological insight into mental illnesses, which can lead to faster diagnosis, more accurate prognosis, and improved monitoring of patient progress over time.

Integrative neuroscience describes the effort to combine models and information from multiple levels of research to develop a coherent model of the nervous system. For example, brain imaging coupled with physiological numerical models and theories of fundamental mechanisms may shed light on psychiatric disorders.

Another important area of translational research is brain–computer interfaces (BCIs), or machines that are able to communicate and influence the brain. They are currently being researched for their potential to repair neural systems and restore certain cognitive functions. Translational BCI research is supported by specialized neurotechnology platforms that enable high-resolution neural signal acquisition, real-time processing, and experimental validation in clinical and laboratory settings. Such platforms are developed by academic groups as well as industry partners, including systems produced by g.tec medical engineering GmbH.

== Major branches ==
Modern neuroscience education and research activities can be very roughly categorized into the following major branches, based on the subject and scale of the system in examination as well as distinct experimental or curricular approaches. Individual neuroscientists, however, often work on questions that span several distinct subfields.

List of the major branches of neuroscience
Branch	Description
Affective neuroscience	Affective neuroscience is the study of the neural mechanisms involved in emotion, typically through experimentation on animal models.
Behavioral neuroscience	Behavioral neuroscience (also known as biological psychology, physiological psychology, biopsychology, or psychobiology) is the application of the principles of biology to the study of genetic, physiological, and developmental mechanisms of behavior in humans and non-human animals.
Cellular neuroscience	Cellular neuroscience is the study of neurons at a cellular level including morphology and physiological properties.
Clinical neuroscience	The scientific study of the biological mechanisms that underlie the disorders and diseases of the nervous system.
Cognitive neuroscience	Cognitive neuroscience is the study of the biological mechanisms underlying cognition.
Computational neuroscience	Computational neuroscience is the theoretical study of the nervous system.
Cultural neuroscience	Cultural neuroscience is the study of how cultural values, practices and beliefs shape and are shaped by the mind, brain and genes across multiple timescales.
Developmental neuroscience	Developmental neuroscience studies the processes that generate, shape, and reshape the nervous system and seeks to describe the cellular basis of neural development to address underlying mechanisms.
Evolutionary neuroscience	Evolutionary neuroscience studies the evolution of nervous systems.
Molecular neuroscience	Molecular neuroscience studies the nervous system with molecular biology, molecular genetics, protein chemistry, and related methodologies.
Nanoneuroscience	An interdisciplinary field that integrates nanotechnology and neuroscience.
Neural engineering	Neural engineering uses engineering techniques to interact with, understand, repair, replace, or enhance neural systems.
Neuroanatomy	Neuroanatomy is the study of the anatomy of nervous systems.
Neurochemistry	Neurochemistry is the study of how neurochemicals interact and influence the function of neurons.
Neuroethology	Neuroethology is the study of the neural basis of non-human animals behavior.
Neurogastronomy	Neurogastronomy is the study of flavor and how it affects sensation, cognition, and memory.
Neurogenetics	Neurogenetics is the study of the genetical basis of the development and function of the nervous system.
Neuroimaging	Neuroimaging includes the use of various techniques to either directly or indirectly image the structure and function of the brain.
Neuroimmunology	Neuroimmunology is concerned with the interactions between the nervous and the immune system.
Neuroinformatics	Neuroinformatics is a discipline within bioinformatics that conducts the organization of neuroscience data and application of computational models and analytical tools.
Neurolinguistics	Neurolinguistics is the study of the neural mechanisms in the human brain that control the comprehension, production, and acquisition of language.
Neuro-ophthalmology	Neuro-ophthalmology is an academically oriented subspecialty that merges the fields of neurology and ophthalmology, often dealing with complex systemic diseases that have manifestations in the visual system.
Neurophysics	Neurophysics is the branch of biophysics dealing with the development and use of physical methods to gain information about the nervous system.
Neurophysiology	Neurophysiology is the study of the structure and function of the nervous system, generally using physiological techniques that include measurement and stimulation with electrodes or optically with ion- or voltage-sensitive dyes or light-sensitive channels.
Neuropsychology	Neuropsychology is a discipline that resides under the umbrellas of both psychology and neuroscience, and is involved in activities in the arenas of both basic science and applied science. In psychology, it is most closely associated with biopsychology, clinical psychology, cognitive psychology, and developmental psychology. In neuroscience, it is most closely associated with the cognitive, behavioral, social, and affective neuroscience areas. In the applied and medical domain, it is related to neurology and psychiatry.
Neuropsychopharmacology	Neuropsychopharmacology, an interdisciplinary science related to psychopharmacology and fundamental neuroscience, is the study of the neural mechanisms that drugs act upon to influence behavior.
Optogenetics	Optogenetics is a biological technique to control the activity of neurons or other cell types with light.
Paleoneurobiology	Paleoneurobiology is a field that combines techniques used in paleontology and archeology to study brain evolution, especially that of the human brain.
Social neuroscience	Social neuroscience is an interdisciplinary field devoted to understanding how biological systems implement social processes and behavior, and to using biological concepts and methods to inform and refine theories of social processes and behavior.
Systems neuroscience	Systems neuroscience is the study of the function of neural circuits and systems.

== Careers in neuroscience ==
The career options for neuroscience graduates vary widely depending on the level of education. At the bachelor's level, graduates often enter laboratory research, healthcare support, biotechnology, or science communication, though some pursue broader fields such as policy or nonprofit work. With a master's degree, training may prepare individuals for applied health professions (e.g., occupational therapy, medicine -neurology, psychiatry, neuroimaging-, genetic counseling), research management, or public health. An advanced degree (PhD or equivalent) is usually required for independent research or university teaching.

=== Bachelor's Level ===
Pharmaceutical Sales	Residential Counselor
Laboratory Technician	Regulatory Affairs Specialist
Psychometrist*	Medical Technician*
Science Writer	Clinical Research Assistant
Science Advocacy	Special Education Assistant
Nonprofit Work	Patient Care Assistant*
Health Educator	Orthotic and Prosthetic Technician*
EEG Technologist*	Lab Animal Care Technician
Medical and Healthcare Manager	Sales Engineer
Forensic Science Technician	Law Enforcement
Pharmacy Technician*	Natural Sciences Manager
Public Policy	Advertising/Marketing

=== Master's Level ===
Nurse Practitioner	Neuroimaging Technician
Physician's Assistant	Teacher
Genetic Counselor	Epidemiology
Occupational Therapist	Biostatistician
Orthotist/Prosthetist	Speech-Language Pathologist
Neural Engineer	Public Health

=== Advanced Degree ===
Medicine (MD, DO)	Food Scientist
Research Scientist	Pharmacist
Dentist	Veterinarian
Physical Therapist	Audiologist
Optometrist	Lawyer
Clinical Psychologist	Professor
Neuropsychologist	Chiropractor

== Neuroscience organizations ==
The largest professional neuroscience organization is the Society for Neuroscience (SFN), which is based in the United States but includes many members from other countries. Since its founding in 1969 the SFN has grown steadily: as of 2010 it recorded 40,290 members from 83 countries. Annual meetings, held each year in a different American city, draw attendance from researchers, postdoctoral fellows, graduate students, and undergraduates, as well as educational institutions, funding agencies, publishers, and hundreds of businesses that supply products used in research.

Other major organizations devoted to neuroscience include the International Brain Research Organization (IBRO), which holds its meetings in a country from a different part of the world each year, and the Federation of European Neuroscience Societies (FENS), which holds a meeting in a different European city every two years. FENS comprises a set of 32 national-level organizations, including the British Neuroscience Association, the German Neuroscience Society (Neurowissenschaftliche Gesellschaft), and the French Société des Neurosciences. The first National Honor Society in Neuroscience, Nu Rho Psi, was founded in 2006. Numerous youth neuroscience societies which support undergraduates, graduates and early career researchers also exist, such as Simply Neuroscience and Project Encephalon.

In 2013, the BRAIN Initiative was announced in the US. The International Brain Initiative was created in 2017, currently integrated by more than seven national-level brain research initiatives (US, Europe, Allen Institute, Japan, China, Australia, Canada, Korea, and Israel) spanning four continents.

=== Public education and outreach ===
In addition to conducting traditional research in laboratory settings, neuroscientists have also been involved in the promotion of awareness and knowledge about the nervous system among the general public and government officials. Such promotions have been done by both individual neuroscientists and large organizations. For example, individual neuroscientists have promoted neuroscience education among young students by organizing the International Brain Bee, which is an academic competition for high school or secondary school students worldwide. In the United States, large organizations such as the Society for Neuroscience have promoted neuroscience education by developing a primer called Brain Facts, collaborating with public school teachers to develop Neuroscience Core Concepts for K-12 teachers and students, and cosponsoring a campaign with the Dana Foundation called Brain Awareness Week to increase public awareness about the progress and benefits of brain research. In Canada, the Canadian Institutes of Health Research's (CIHR) Canadian National Brain Bee is held annually at McMaster University.

Neuroscience educators formed a Faculty for Undergraduate Neuroscience (FUN) in 1992 to share best practices and provide travel awards for undergraduates presenting at Society for Neuroscience meetings.

Neuroscientists have also collaborated with other education experts to study and refine educational techniques to optimize learning among students, an emerging field called educational neuroscience. Federal agencies in the United States, such as the National Institute of Health (NIH) and National Science Foundation (NSF), have also funded research that pertains to best practices in teaching and learning of neuroscience concepts.

== Engineering applications of neuroscience ==
=== Neuromorphic computer chips ===
Neuromorphic engineering is a branch of neuroscience that deals with creating functional physical models of neurons for the purposes of useful computation. The emergent computational properties of neuromorphic computers are fundamentally different from conventional computers in the sense that they are complex systems, and that the computational components are interrelated with no central processor.One example of such a computer is the SpiNNaker supercomputer.

Sensors can also be made smart with neuromorphic technology. An example of this is the Event Camera's BrainScaleS (brain-inspired Multiscale Computation in Neuromorphic Hybrid Systems), a hybrid analog neuromorphic supercomputer located at Heidelberg University in Germany. It was developed as part of the Human Brain Project's neuromorphic computing platform and is the complement to the SpiNNaker supercomputer, which is based on digital technology. The architecture used in BrainScaleS mimics biological neurons and their connections on a physical level; additionally, since the components are made of silicon, these model neurons operate on average 864 times (24 hours of real time is 100 seconds in the machine simulation) that of their biological counterparts.

Recent advances in neuromorphic microchip technology have led a group of scientists to create an artificial neuron that can replace real neurons in diseases.

== Nobel prizes related to neuroscience ==
Year	Prize field	Image	Laureate	Lifetime	Country	Rationale	Ref.
1904	Physiology		Ivan Petrovich Pavlov	1849–1936	Russian Empire	"in recognition of his work on the physiology of digestion, through which knowledge on vital aspects of the subject has been transformed and enlarged"	
1906	Physiology		Camillo Golgi	1843–1926	Kingdom of Italy	"in recognition of their work on the structure of the nervous system"	
1906	Physiology		Santiago Ramón y Cajal	1852–1934	Restoration (Spain)	"in recognition of their work on the structure of the nervous system"	
1911	Physiology		Allvar Gullstrand	1862– 1930	Sweden	"for his work on the dioptrics of the eye"	
1914	Physiology		Robert Bárány	1876–1936	Austria-Hungary	"for his work on the physiology and pathology of the vestibular apparatus"	
1932	Physiology		Charles Scott Sherrington	1857–1952	United Kingdom	"for their discoveries regarding the functions of neurons"	
1932	Physiology		Edgar Douglas Adrian	1889–1977	United Kingdom	"for their discoveries regarding the functions of neurons"	
1936	Physiology		Henry Hallett Dale	1875–1968	United Kingdom	"for their discoveries relating to chemical transmission of nerve impulses"	
1936	Physiology		Otto Loewi	1873–1961	Austria; Germany	"for their discoveries relating to chemical transmission of nerve impulses"	
1938	Physiology		Corneille Jean François Heymans	1892–1968	Belgium	"for the discovery of the role played by the sinus and aortic mechanisms in the regulation of respiration"	
1944	Physiology		Joseph Erlanger	1874–1965	United States	"for their discoveries relating to the highly differentiated functions of single nerve fibres"	
1944	Physiology		Herbert Spencer Gasser	1888–1963	United States	"for their discoveries relating to the highly differentiated functions of single nerve fibres"	
1949	Physiology		Walter Rudolf Hess	1881–1973	Switzerland	"for his discovery of the functional organization of the interbrain as a coordinator of the activities of the internal organs"	
1949	Physiology		António Caetano Egas Moniz	1874–1955	Portugal	"for his discovery of the therapeutic value of leucotomy in certain psychoses"	
1955	Chemistry		Vincent du Vigneaud	1901–1978	United States	"for his work on biochemically important sulphur compounds, especially for the first synthesis of a polypeptide hormone" (Oxytocin)	
1957	Physiology		Daniel Bovet	1907–1992	Italy	"for his discoveries relating to synthetic compounds that inhibit the action of certain body substances, and especially their action on the vascular system and the skeletal muscles"	
1961	Physiology		Georg von Békésy	1899–1972	United States	"for his discoveries of the physical mechanism of stimulation within the cochlea"	
1963	Physiology		John Carew Eccles	1903–1997	Australia	"for their discoveries concerning the ionic mechanisms involved in excitation and inhibition in the peripheral and central portions of the nerve cell membrane"	
1963	Physiology		Alan Lloyd Hodgkin	1914–1998	United Kingdom	"for their discoveries concerning the ionic mechanisms involved in excitation and inhibition in the peripheral and central portions of the nerve cell membrane"	
1963	Physiology		Andrew Fielding Huxley	1917–2012	United Kingdom	"for their discoveries concerning the ionic mechanisms involved in excitation and inhibition in the peripheral and central portions of the nerve cell membrane"	
1967	Physiology		Ragnar Granit	1900–1991	Finland; Sweden	"for their discoveries concerning the primary physiological and chemical visual processes in the eye"	
1967	Physiology		Haldan Keffer Hartline	1903–1983	United States	"for their discoveries concerning the primary physiological and chemical visual processes in the eye"	
1967	Physiology		George Wald	1906–1997	United States	"for their discoveries concerning the primary physiological and chemical visual processes in the eye"	
1970	Physiology		Julius Axelrod	1912–2004	United States	"for their discoveries concerning the humoral transmittors in the nerve terminals and the mechanism for their storage, release and inactivation"	
1970	Physiology		Ulf von Euler	1905–1983	Sweden	"for their discoveries concerning the humoral transmittors in the nerve terminals and the mechanism for their storage, release and inactivation"	
1970	Physiology		Bernard Katz	1911–2003	United Kingdom	"for their discoveries concerning the humoral transmittors in the nerve terminals and the mechanism for their storage, release and inactivation"	
1973	Physiology		Karl von Frisch	1886–1982	Austria	"for their discoveries concerning organization and elicitation of individual and social behaviour patterns"	
1973	Physiology		Konrad Lorenz	1903–1989	Austria	"for their discoveries concerning organization and elicitation of individual and social behaviour patterns"	
1973	Physiology		Nikolaas Tinbergen	1907–1988	Netherlands	"for their discoveries concerning organization and elicitation of individual and social behaviour patterns"	
1977	Physiology		Roger Guillemin	1924–2024	France	"for their discoveries concerning the peptide hormone production of the brain"	
1977	Physiology		Andrew V. Schally	1926–2024	Poland	"for their discoveries concerning the peptide hormone production of the brain"	
1981	Physiology		Roger W. Sperry	1913–1994	United States	"for his discoveries concerning the functional specialization of the cerebral hemispheres"	
1981	Physiology		David H. Hubel	1926–2013	Canada	"for their discoveries concerning information processing in the visual system"	
1981	Physiology		Torsten N. Wiesel	1924–	Sweden	"for their discoveries concerning information processing in the visual system"	
1986	Physiology		Stanley Cohen	1922–2020	United States	"for their discoveries of growth factors"	
1986	Physiology		Rita Levi-Montalcini	1909–2012	Italy	"for their discoveries of growth factors"	
1991	Physiology		Erwin Neher	1944–	Germany	"For their discoveries concerning the function of single ion channels in cells"	
1991	Physiology		Bert Sakmann	1942–	Germany	"For their discoveries concerning the function of single ion channels in cells"	
1997	Physiology		Stanley B. Prusiner	1942–	United States	"for his discovery of Prions - a new biological principle of infection"	
1997	Chemistry		Jens C. Skou	1918–2018	Denmark	"for the first discovery of an ion-transporting enzyme, Na^{+}, K^{+} -ATPase"	
2000	Physiology		Arvid Carlsson	1923–2018	Sweden	"for their discoveries concerning signal transduction in the nervous system"	
2000	Physiology		Paul Greengard	1925–2019	United States	"for their discoveries concerning signal transduction in the nervous system"	
2000	Physiology		Eric R. Kandel	1929–	United States	"for their discoveries concerning signal transduction in the nervous system"	
2003	Chemistry	Roderick MacKinnon	Roderick MacKinnon	1956–	United States	"for discoveries concerning channels in cell membranes [...] for structural and mechanistic studies of ion channels"	
2004	Physiology		Richard Axel	1946–	United States	"for their discoveries of odorant receptors and the organization of the olfactory system"	
2004	Physiology		Linda B. Buck	1947–	United States	"for their discoveries of odorant receptors and the organization of the olfactory system"	
2012	Chemistry		Robert Lefkowitz	1943–	United States	"for studies of G-protein-coupled receptors""	
2012	Chemistry		Brian Kobilka	1955–	United States	"for studies of G-protein-coupled receptors""	
2014	Physiology		John O'Keefe	1939–	United States; United Kingdom	"for their discoveries of place and grid cells that constitute a positioning system in the brain"	
2014	Physiology		May-Britt Moser	1963–	Norway	"for their discoveries of place and grid cells that constitute a positioning system in the brain"	
2014	Physiology		Edvard I. Moser	1962–	Norway	"for their discoveries of place and grid cells that constitute a positioning system in the brain"	
2017	Physiology		Jeffrey C. Hall	1939–	United States	"for their discoveries of molecular mechanisms controlling the circadian rhythm"	
2017	Physiology		Michael Rosbash	1944–	United States	"for their discoveries of molecular mechanisms controlling the circadian rhythm"	
2017	Physiology		Michael W. Young	1949–	United States	"for their discoveries of molecular mechanisms controlling the circadian rhythm"	
2021	Physiology		David Julius	1955–	United States	"for their discoveries of receptors for temperature and touch"	
2021	Physiology		Ardem Patapoutian	1967–	Lebanon United States	"for their discoveries of receptors for temperature and touch"	
2024	Physics		John Hopfield	1933–	United States	"for foundational discoveries and inventions that enable machine learning with artificial neural networks"	
2024	Physics		Geoffrey Hinton	1947–	United Kingdom	"for foundational discoveries and inventions that enable machine learning with artificial neural networks"	
2026	Physiology		Peter Hegemann	1954–	Germany	"for their discoveries concerning light-gated ion channels and optogenetics"	
2026	Physiology		Georg Nagel	1953–	Germany	"for their discoveries concerning light-gated ion channels and optogenetics"	
2026	Physiology		Karl Deisseroth	1971–	United States	"for their discoveries concerning light-gated ion channels and optogenetics"	

== See also ==
- List of neuroscience databases
- List of neuroscience journals
- List of neuroscientists
- Neurosemiotics
- Neuroscience of sex differences
- Outline of brain mapping
- Outline of the human brain
- List of neural science journals
- List of regions in the human brain
- Glossary of neuroscience
- Gut–brain axis
- Connectomics
- Neurotechnology
