= Molecular layer =

Molecular layer may refer to:

- Molecular layer of cerebral cortex
- Molecular layer of cerebellar cortex
- Molecular layer of dentate gyrus
