= Evolving classification function =

Evolving classification functions (ECF), evolving classifier functions or evolving classifiers are used for classifying and clustering in the field of machine learning and artificial intelligence, typically employed for data stream mining tasks in dynamic and changing environments.

== See also ==
- Supervised Classification on Data Streams
- Evolving fuzzy rule-based Classifier (eClass)
- Evolving Takagi-Sugeno fuzzy systems (eTS)
- Evolving All-Pairs (ensembled) classifiers (EFC-AP)
- Evolving Connectionist Systems (ECOS)

Dynamic Evolving Neuro-Fuzzy Inference Systems (DENFIS)
Evolving Fuzzy Neural Networks (EFuNN)
Evolving Self-Organising Maps

- neuro-fuzzy techniques
- hybrid intelligent systems
- fuzzy clustering
- Growing Neural Gas
