= Geniculate nucleus =

Geniculate nucleus may refer to two structures in the brain:

- Lateral geniculate nucleus, in visual perception
- Medial geniculate nucleus, in hearing

== See also ==
- Geniculate ganglion, of the facial nerve
