= Menstruation and humoral medicine =

Many beliefs about menstruation in the early modern period were linked to humorism, the system of medicine introduced by Ancient Greek and Roman physicians. People believed that the human body contained four humours: blood, phlegm, yellow bile, and black bile. Illnesses and problems were understood as being caused by dyscrasia, or an imbalance in the four humours. Treatments for disease had the aim of restoring balance, curing the patient. The humoral model was a continuity during the early modern period, despite the fact that new medical theories began to arise in the second half of the eighteenth century, because these new ideas which used different treatments involving new chemicals were not as trusted since they were not properly established.

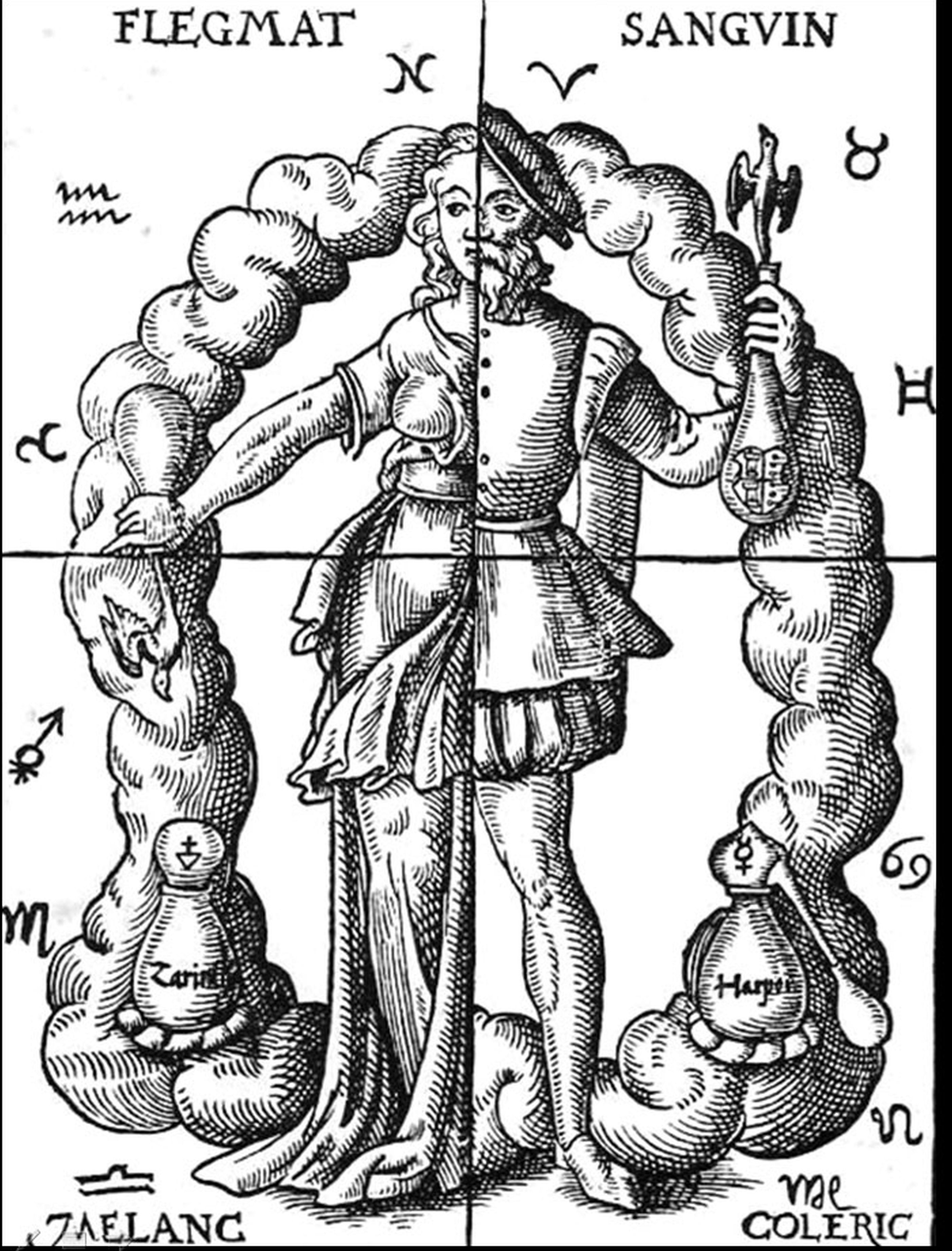
Alchemic approach to four humors in relation to the four elements and zodiacal signs. Book illustration in Quinta Essentia by Leonhart Thurneisser zum Thurn (gen. Leonhard Thurneysser). Inscriptions (clockwise): Flegmat, Sanguin, Coleric, Melanc. Person is androgyne.

In this way, medical and popular beliefs about menstrual problems such as irregular menstruation, amenorrhea (absence of periods whilst fertile) or dysmenorrhea (painful periods) were thought of in relation to the four humours. In early modern western Europe, physicians believed that the womb could not be too cold, hot, moist or dry and that an excess in any of these could impact a woman's fertility. Significantly, people believed that warmth encouraged sexual pleasure and increased the probability of conceiving a child, meaning that the womb had to be warm during intercourse. If a woman was found to be having problems menstruating which would then impact their fertility, remedies which aimed to alter the humoral state of the body were used. Aphrodisiacs were a common remedy given to women with menstrual problems, since they were believed to have internal heating effects, stimulating menstruation by redressing the constitutional balance of a womb that was too cold.

== Beliefs on menstruation and conception ==
The humoral model was not the only way menstruation was understood in the early modern period. The four humours helped guide physicians to give remedies for menstrual problems, but there were different understandings of what menstruation might be caused by. The two main beliefs surrounding menstruation were either that it was necessary to remove an excess of blood, or to purify blood. Some believed that women had an excess of blood which the body needed to get rid of in the form of a period. This excess was due to the belief that women's bodies could not use all of the blood in their body unlike men, making them weaker. Others believed in the Aristotelian model, which purifies women's blood. According to this model, after menstruation a purified substance is left which forms a foetus once mixed with the male seed. A further function of menstrual blood was proposed by the Galen model. This was the belief that after conception the foetus was nourished in the womb by menstrual blood. This shows that in early modern period menstrual blood and conception itself were linked together.

With this in mind, what can be perceived as a classic negative attitude towards menstruation can be re-evaluated. For example, in the Bible (Ezekiel) men are advised to not have sex with a woman who is menstruating. The passage states that "a good man" should "not to lie with a menstruous woman". This could be interpreted as an example of the stigmatisation of menstruation, and how menstrual blood was considered to be dirty and not pure. In a translation of a sixteenth-century text on the art of having beautiful children published early in the eighteenth century, the message that no procreation should occur while the woman is menstruating is very clear. This text can be used as an example of the disgust towards menstruation that may have been found at the time:

Press not your Wives, tho height'nd Lust incite The Soul to try the pleasurable Fight, While the Blood monthly rushing from the Veins, The Flowing Womb with foul Pollution stains ... But if by Chance the Seeds concurring fix, And with th'impurer Dross of Nature mix, What a detested, miscreated Thing From such ill-suited Principles must spring? Foul Leprous Spots shall with his Birth begin, Spread o'er his Body, and encrust his Skin; For the same Poison which that Stream contains, Transfer'd affects the forming Infant's Veins, Inbred it fixes deep, and radically reigns.

However, the conclusion that attitudes towards menstruation were completely negative is not certain. Some historians have argued that the advice followed by many men found in the Bible was not because of a stigma or a hostile attitude towards menstrual blood, but because sex during menstruation was thought to impact healthy conception. While it is hard to know exactly which theory is correct, it is important to examine the medical context, because the humoral model emphasised the need for balance between the four humours. This means that blood could be healthy or polluting depending on the humoral context in which blood was discharged and observed, in the same way that menstrual blood was viewed differently depending on certain situations.

== Menstrual provocation and abortion ==
The use of emmenagogues (substances used to promote menstruation) was a key part of sexual health practices associated with fertility and humoral medicine in the early modern period. Aphrodisiacs and hot spices were used to warm up the womb, stimulating menstruation. This was believed to purge the womb of all its contents, including a foetus, as a means of abortion. Abortion was not the only function of emmenagogues. They were also used to provoke menstruation which was linked to conception and reproduction. In this way, by purging the womb menstruation would occur and depending on which model people believed in, the menstrual blood helped the formation of the foetus and its healthy growth.

== Menstruation vs male forms of bleeding ==
The early modern belief in the humoral model and the need to maintain the balance between blood, phlegm, yellow bile, and black bile means that it has been argued that other forms of bleeding were considered to be similar to menstruation in women. People believed that menstrual blood represented an excess in blood that women had, however it is not completely clear whether menstrual blood was viewed in a different way to normal blood. In this way, a man who had a humoral imbalance may also need to get rid of excess blood. This means that male periodic emissions like nose bleeds, haemorrhoidal flux, blood-letting, and sweating were viewed similarly to menstruation, and were even considered to be a form of vicarious menstruation. As a result the humoral model does not necessarily make a distinction between male bleeding and female menstruation. While bleeding in men represented a re-balancing and for women it had a further role in reproduction, male regularity could also be implicated in reproductive potential because of the belief that the fertile potential of semen fluctuated. Interestingly in 1701 William Musgrave described a case where a man bled from his thumb every month from infancy until the age of 24. This monthly bleeding did not affect his health, however when he chose to sear his thumb with a hot iron to stop the bleeding, this changed. His health worsened and he began to cough up blood. His doctor concluded that this monthly bleeding in a man was similar to a woman's period, being nature's way of keeping bodies balanced. This is a very specific example of a rare case of male periodic bleeding, however it does shed light on the way that male blood was viewed in comparison to menstrual blood.

== Menstruation and superstition ==
While there were some theories surrounding menstruation that were linked to beliefs in the humoral model in the early modern era, some beliefs were extremely superstitious. There are many tales that can be found in folklore that make a menstruating woman be a sign of good luck. Generally menstruation had a mysterious nature. For centuries people believed that the beginning of a woman's period was controlled by the moon or even by multiples of the number seven. Menstrual blood was believed to be a cure for animal bites or stop fevers. There are stories that recount that if a young menstruating virgin touched the posts of a house it would protect it and there could be no troubles there.
