= On Ancient Medicine =

Greek medical text, c. 450–400 BCE

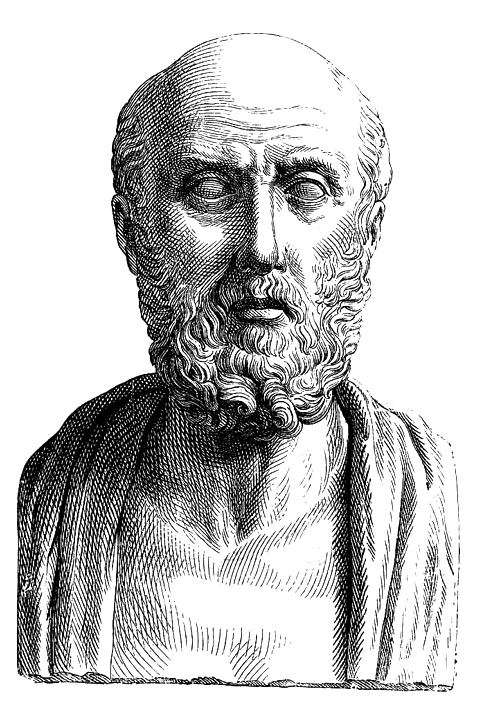
Hippocrates

The treatise On Ancient Medicine (Greek: Περὶ Ἀρχαίας Ἰατρικῆς; Latin: De vetere medicina) is a work in the Hippocratic Corpus, a collection of about sixty writings covering all areas of medical thought and practice. Traditionally associated with Hippocrates, (c. 460 BC – c. 370 BC) the father of Western medicine, philological evidence now suggests that it was written over a period of several centuries and stylistically seems to indicate that it was the product of many authors dating from about 450–400 B.C.

== Ancient medicine in Greece ==
The medical practice of Hippocrates used natural aspects to treat diseases. The Hippocratic teachings on the value of knowing a patient's health, independence of thought, and the necessity for balance between the individuals, the social environment, and the natural environment. These foundations of health were incorporated in Ancient Greece to help discover the source of illness and to help promote health.

To maintain health, Ancient Greeks followed the belief that physical and mental health work together. Aristotle believed that the best way to achieve harmony between the mind and body is to participate in sports and gymnastics. It has been suggested that sessions of aerobics, for example walking, will help to boost cognitive attention control in children. Data suggests that exercise improves scholastic performance.

To enhance both physical and mental health, physical movement was an essential component of academic learning. Special services were offered by teachers known as "paidotrivai" during the Olympic Games. According to a study by Hippocrates, olive oil was used to warm up, increase body temperature, and become more flexible, and athletes were given figs as well as other fruits containing high glucose concentrations to help them perform better.

== Trauma, therapy and interventions ==
Up until the Middle Ages, Hippocrates and Galen had quite an impact on surgical treatment procedures for wounds and injuries. For instance, Hippocrates identified the splitting of limb gangrene and treated the ailment by making incisions between the dead and the living tissue. He thought that after treating the wounds with pure water or wine, they needed to be kept dry in order to heal correctly and rapidly. Also, he thought that the development of pus contributed to the decrease of wound complications. These discoveries influenced surgical treatment procedures for wounds and injuries up to the Middle Ages.

The earliest taxonomy of mental illnesses was proposed by Hippocrates, and it included mania, melancholy, phrenitis, insanity, disobedience, paranoia, panic, epilepsy, and hysteria. He held that intellect and sensitivity enter the brain through the lips by breathing and that the brain is the primary organ responsible for mental diseases. He held that the four fluids blood, phlegm, yellow bile, and black bile as well as observation, study of the reasons, balance of theory, and the four liquids themselves form the basis for the diagnosis and treatment of both physical and mental illnesses. According to Plato's view, there are two possible ways to repair the body and the soul. While medicine and gymnastics are seen as legitimate remedies, the legislative and judicial systems are necessary for true soul healing. The betterment of human conduct and the treatment of both mental and physical diseases depended heavily on music and theater. It was thought that using music to heal the spirit also treated the body, along with particular musical treatments for particular illnesses. The first person to use music as treatment to overcome pain was Asclepius. According to Aristotle, religious music that uplifts the spirit has a similar impact on individuals who have undergone therapy and mental catharsis. "Catharsis," or the letting go of emotions via performance, took place in the Theater of Epidaurus in the Ancient Temple of Epidaurus.

== On Ancient Medicine ==
The basic arguments of On Ancient Medicine have three components. In chapters 1–19 the author responds to the supporters of the hypothesis theory of medicine. In so doing he argues that the exploration of medicine itself reveals the human organism as a blend of diverse substances or humors. Having set forth this humoral theory, he then critiques the hypothesis theory proposed by his opponents as being an oversimplified conception of the cause of disease. Against this backdrop, he discusses his own theory and method he employed in its discovery (chaps. 20–24). He then responds to the charge that ancient medicine is not a genuine medical art because it has limited accuracy. These arguments must be seen in the light of the author's theory of human physiology (chaps. 9–12).

=== Chapters 1–19 ===
The author is responding to the supporters of the hypothesis theory by arguing that medicine has a systematic character to qualify it as a tekhne (art, craft or science). This genuine tekhne depends on the knowledge of the physician attained through first-hand experience that enables him to both distinguish diverse treatments and to realize success in their skillful administration (1). Medicine should not proceed with hypotheses or generalizations; rather it should be rooted in experience and discovery. It should be empirical in its methodology. Hence, in chapter 2 the author argues that medicine's principle and method enables the physician to make discoveries over a long period of time. The discipline must be flexible and receptive to new discoveries. In chapters 3–8, the author supports the claim that medicine has a method of discovery by giving an account of medicine's origins and discoveries. He traces it back to a regimen beneficial for the sick and observes that some foods are not beneficial for either the healthy or the sick. The author cites accounts of human beings from the fifth-century who suffered as a result of their savage diet. As a result, techniques were developed for the preparation of food best suited in producing a healthy and civilized human being. He likens it to a medical discovery (3.4-6); and as such constitutes a general tekhne. The author establishes a close methodological parallel between cooking and medicine. In cooking it is critical to recognize that human beings have a nature distinct from animals. For instance, humans are less capable of digesting raw meats. Thus, allowances must be made in the preparation and cooking of meat that best suit the human metabolism (3.5). The most common element between cooking and medicine is the mixing and blending of foods. Medicine, however, requires a greater discrimination between food types and classes of individuals so that correct nutritional needs may be identified and prescribed (5). The practitioner in the end acquires mastery of preparing foods and the ability to identify the class of individuals to whom the food is administered. In this regard, cooking and medicine are the same (chaps. 7–8).

It is in chapter 13 that the author returns to his analysis of his opponent's hypothesis theory. His goal is to explore the potential consequences of the principle in question. The proponents of cure by contraries assume that all diseases have their roots in the humors hot, cold, wet, dry, and that the cure for each disease is the opposite of the cause. The author imagines a situation where a person changes his food from cooked to raw and as a result becomes ill. Thus, the cause of a given illness is associated with a given humor and the cure as being that humor's opposite. Hot therefore would cure cold, and dry would be the cure for wet. The author sees this as an oversimplification. He argues that cooking is a process in which the original raw food losses some of its qualities and gains others by mixing and blending (13.3). Human beings are affected by the food they consume because every food has its own innate virtues. It is important for the physician to identify these virtues (14.1-2). The attainment of such knowledge demands a clear understanding of human nature. The human being, explains the author, contains a blend of many humors. When the humors are balanced or properly mixed the human being is healthy, but when they are unbalanced or improperly mixed and one is more concentrated than the other, pain and disease is the result (14.4-6).

In chapter 15 the author argues that whereas the proponents of humoral medicine see food purely as hot, cold, wet, or dry, human beings also possess a quality such as sweet or bitter. These qualities are the ones that cause serious harm to the body. In Chapter 16, the author presents a number of examples from common experience. For instance, in a fever hot and cold humors counteract each other in the body without the need of medical aid. As he points out in chapter 17, however, in some cases the fever persists. This is an indication that hot is not the sole cause of the fever. There must be some other inherent factor responsible for sustaining the fever. In chapters 18 and 19, he continues to develop the idea that recovery from disease comes about when there is a blending and coction of the humors. Coction is the act or process of attaining a more perfect or more desirable condition. The importance of coction in the author's theory also reflects his close analogy between medicine and cooking. Just as the cook brings about coction in food external to the human organism; the physician brings about coction of the bodily humors.

=== Chapters 20–24 ===
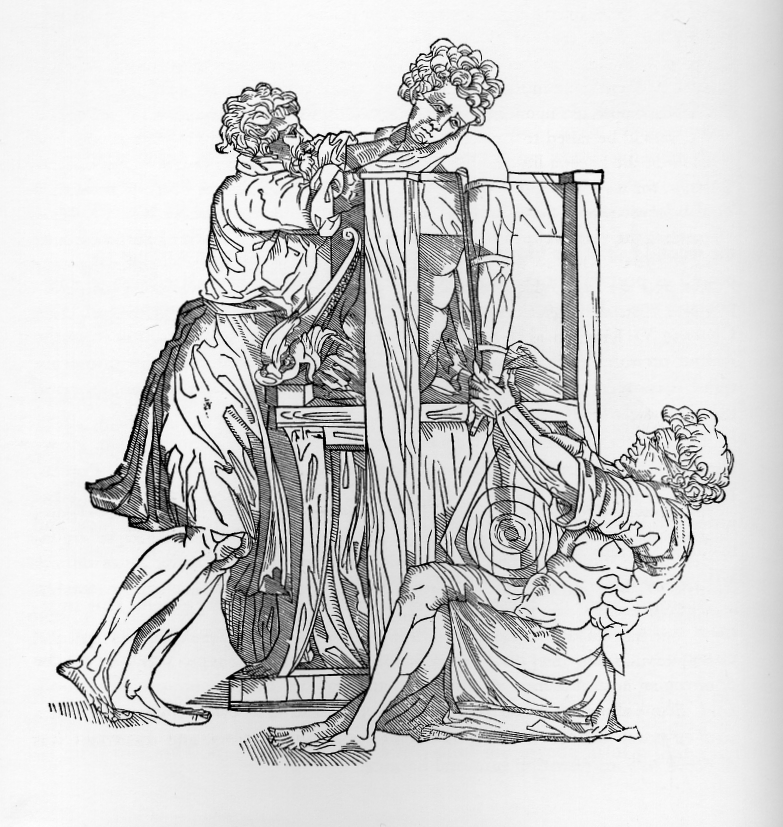
A woodcut of the reduction of a dislocated shoulder with a Hippocratic device

In chapter 20 the author dismisses the theories of human nature associated with Empedocles and the pre-Socratic inquiry as irrelevant to medical practices. He argues that their theories lean towards philosophy and have more to do with the art of writing than with medicine. The author believes that the theory of human nature must be based on medicine, through the observation of the human organism within nature. He takes exception to thinkers such as Empedocles who attempted to provide such an understanding through his cosmological theories. Practically speaking, for medicine to be effective the physician needs to know the true nature of man and this must be determined through his relationship to food, drink, and other practices associated with the human organism (20.3). Therefore, the physician must understand the constituency of food and its effects on the body of the patient he is treating. In Chapters 22–24 the author extends the nature theory to include bodily structures. He also expands his theory of knowledge by advocating the use of analogies to attain an understanding of that which cannot be observed directly within the human organism.

=== Chapters 9–12 ===
In chapters 9–12 the author argues that there is a corresponding relationship between the physician's experience and knowledge and his ability to practice the art of medicine. The greater the general and specific knowledge attained by the physician, the more accurate his diagnostic and therapeutic skills to include preparation and administration of prescriptions or remedies. This is critical because the same illness manifests itself differently in each patient and treatment must correspond to individual symptoms, and not to the common symptoms. This also applies to dietary measures. Thus, in the preparation and administration of remedies or dietary measures, care must be given not only in selecting the quantity and quality of the preparation or remedy, but also to the timing of its administration which must take into account bodily rhythms. The physician, the author argues, must rely upon the reaction of the individual to the treatment. This is indeed a complex process which demands both the education and precision of the physician. Hippocrates argues that even if the ancient art of medicine "does not possess precision in everything; rather, since it has been able to come, by means of reasoning, from profound ignorance close to perfect accuracy, I think it much more appropriate to marvel at its discoveries as having been made admirably, correctly, and not by chance".

== Date ==
The dates proposed by Schiefsky for On Ancient Medicine span from 440 to around 350 BC. There are a number of considerations which strongly suggest a date in the late fifth century. That the author refers to Empedocles (490–430 B.C.) as motivation of the method he attacks suggests a date not long after his peak of activity. The author's sense of discovery and benefits of technology are characteristic of late fifth-century thought. The idea that human beings rose through technology from savage behavior has parallels in Sophocles' fifth-century work, Antigone. Furthermore, the author's attack on the written account of medicine by sophists as having nothing to do with the art of medicine is a discussion taken up by the fifth-century thinker Socrates in The Phaedo. Also, the treatise's interest in 'things in the sky and under the earth' also characterizes Aristophanes' Clouds (424 BC.) and Plato's Apology.

Elizabeth Craik agrees that a date in the last few decades of the 5th century BC is plausible. She similarly argues for this conclusion on the grounds that the author alludes to Empedocles (whom Craik argues died in 423 BC) and that the use of term sophistai ('sophists') is used dismissively but not pejoratively.

== Influence ==
There are two main proponents when discussing the influences on the treatise, whether of philosophy on medicine or the reverse. Hans Diller attempted to show that the author's point of view was influenced mostly by Plato. Ludwig Edelstein argued the author characterized 'Hippocratic empiricism', "a methodological stance characterized by the rejection of all generalizations and resulting from the influence of Protagorean relativism on medical thought." The proponents for tracing influence in the opposite direction, from medicine to philosophy, argued that the work On Ancient Medicine influenced Protagoras. It is possible, however, that different thinkers could come to similar conclusions regarding natural philosophy and practice independently of one another.

== Authorship ==
Since the work of Émile Littré in the nineteenth century, the treatise On Ancient Medicine has been scrutinized to aid in answering the 'Hippocratic question': the question about which of the works in the Hippocratic corpus were written by Hippocrates. Littré was the scholar most associated with advocating that On Ancient Medicine was written by Hippocrates. He thought that the treatise was the work to which Plato was referring in The Phaedrus. However, it is difficult to reconstruct the historical Hippocrates with our existing evidence amounting to a brief account in the Anonymous Londinensis papyrus, and a few references in Plato and Aristotle. Based on the information available for the treatise On Ancient Medicine, it is impossible to definitively answer the Hippocratic question.
