= Hippocratic Corpus =

Collection of around 60 Ancient Greek medical works

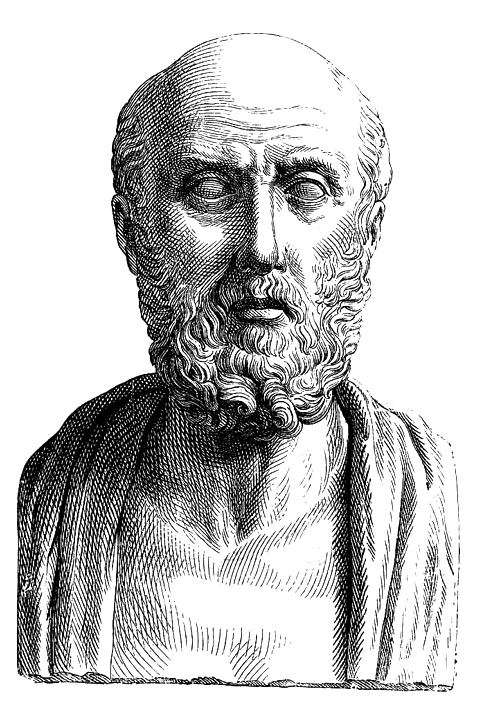
Bust of Hippocrates

Vaticanus graecus 277, 10v-11r: Table of contents in a fourteenth-century Hippocratic Corpus manuscript. Marcus Fabius Calvus owned this manuscript, transcribed it in his own hand, and used it in the preparation of his 1525 Latin translation.

The Hippocratic Corpus (Latin: Corpus Hippocraticum), or Hippocratic Collection, is a collection of around 60 early Ancient Greek medical works closely associated with the physician Hippocrates and his teachings. The Hippocratic Corpus covers many diverse aspects of medicine, from Hippocrates' medical theories to what he devised to be ethical means of medical practice, to addressing various illnesses. Even though it is considered a singular corpus that represents Hippocratic medicine, they vary (sometimes significantly) in content, age, style, methods, and views practiced; therefore, authorship is largely unknown. The ancient commentaries on this corpus, from writers such as Attalion and Oribasius, are myriad. Hippocrates began Western society's development of medicine, through a delicate blending of the art of healing and scientific observations. What Hippocrates was sharing from within his collection of works was not only how to identify symptoms of disease and proper diagnostic practices, but more essentially, he was alluding to his personable form of art, "The art of true living and the art of fine medicine combined." The Hippocratic Corpus became the foundation upon which Western medical practice was built.

== Hippocrates' contribution to medicine ==
Hippocrates was born c. 460 BCE on the Greek island of Kos. The verifiable details of his life are few, despite centuries of hagiographic accounts. According to tradition, Hippocrates was born into a hereditary order of priest-like physicians known as Asclepiads. At the time, the practice of medicine involved spiritual and supernatural elements, corresponding to the prevailing belief that health and illness were conferred by the gods. Hippocrates did not share this view. For example, according to works later ascribed to him, he was the first to describe epilepsy as an inheritable brain disease rather than an infliction from the divine. In addition to his rejection of purely divine causes of illness, Hippocrates rejected the idea that medicine could only be practiced by those born into the priestly Asclepiad class like himself. He went on to establish a medical school at Kos and opened it to those born outside of the Asclepiad class. Known as the father of medicine, Hippocrates was an admirable physician and teacher during his time. When considered among fellow ancient Greek philosophers and physicians, Hippocrates was considered the most influential in the evolution of medicine as a science. He focused on a natural approach to medicine, expressing that there had to be a comprehensive understanding of the patient's health, as well as harmony between nature and the individual.

Hippocrates' focal point for medicine stemmed from the practice of scientific discipline. To enforce scientific discipline, Hippocrates based his medical principles on natural sciences, diagnosing, treating, and preventing medical diseases. In addition to a focus on natural approaches, he also began to look into anatomical and physiological relationships in the body. He also heavily believed in the study of anatomy and the nervous system. By understanding the anatomy of the human body, Hippocrates was able to recognize symptoms holistically when diagnosing a patient. To align completely with his emphasis on the physical observation of the human body, Hippocrates eliminated any religious element from his account of medicine. In the Hippocratic text On Flesh, On Regimen, On Diseases I, On Winds, relevant works from the Hippocratic Corpus, he firmly established the limited focus he planned to employ with his medical concerns, that is, he had determined that he would only entertain natural phenomena that are relevant to the medical issue at hand.

Another contribution Hippocrates had to medicine was evidence-based knowledge. Hippocrates was the first to ever establish the belief that by simply observing a patient, a physician would recognize symptoms and determine the disease. Hippocrates insisted that he must keep careful notes and follow the patient from the start of the disease to the end no matter what that might have looked like so he could compile different symptoms and treatments. The ideal of evidence-based knowledge is still implemented in the medical field and has set the standards for physicians today. According to Hippocrates, medicine was dependent on detailed observation of symptoms and health, prognosis, treatment of the patient, and reason to establish diagnosis.

While the Hippocratic Corpus was not written by Hippocrates himself, the compiled work of medical professionals all follow the same guidelines imposed by Hippocratic medicine. Hippocrates laid the foundation for modern medicine, as his protocols and guidelines for the classification of diseases are being utilized by physicians today. His principles for the diagnosis, treatment and prevention of diseases have been preserved in the Hippocratic Corpus, and are the standard for medical ethics today.

== Authorship, name, origin ==
Magni Hippocratis medicorum omnium facile principis, opera omnia quae extant, 1657

Of the texts in the corpus, none is proven to be by Hippocrates himself, The works of the corpus range from Hippocrates' time and school to many centuries later and rival points of view. Franz Zacharias Ermerins identifies the hands of at least nineteen authors in the Hippocratic Corpus. However, the varied works of the corpus have gone under Hippocrates' name since antiquity. According to Howard Clark Kee, it is a haphazard collection of anonymous authors.

The corpus may be the remains of a library of Cos, or a collection compiled in the third century BC in Alexandria. However, the corpus includes works beyond those of the Coan school of ancient Greek medicine; works from the Cnidian school are included as well.

Only a fraction of the Hippocratic writings have survived. The lost medical literature is sometimes referred to in the surviving treatises, as at the beginning of Regimen. Some Hippocratic works are known only in translation from their original Greek to other languages; given that the quality and accuracy of a translation without a surviving original cannot be known, it is difficult to identify the author with certainty. "Hippocratic" texts survive in Arabic, Hebrew, Syriac, and Latin.

== Dates and groupings ==
The majority of the works in the Hippocratic Corpus date from the Classical period, the last decades of the 5th century BC and the first half of the 4th century BC. Among the later works, The Law, On the Heart, On the Physician, and On Sevens are all Hellenistic, while Precepts and On Decorum are from the 1st and 2nd centuries AD.

Some of the earliest works of the corpus (mid-fifth century) are connected to the Cnidian school: On Diseases II–III and the early layer within On the Diseases of Women I–II and On Sterile Women. Prorrhetics I is also mid-fifth century. In the second half of the fifth century, a single author likely produced the treatises On Airs, Waters, Places; Prognostics; Prorrhetics II; and On the Sacred Disease. Other fifth-century works include On Fleshes, Epidemics I and III (c. 410 BC), On Ancient Medicine, On Regimen in Acute Diseases, and Polybus' On the Nature of Man/Regimen in Health (410–400 BC).

At the end of the fifth or the beginning of the fourth century, one author likely wrote Epidemics II–IV–VI and On the Humors. The coherent group of surgical treatises (On Fractures, On Joints, On Injuries of the Head, Surgery, Mochlicon) is of similar date.

The gynecological treatises On the Nature of the Woman, On the Diseases of Women, Generation, On the Nature of the Child, and On Sterile Women constitute a closely related group. Hermann Grensemann identified five layers of material in this group, from the mid-fifth century to the mid-fourth century. The oldest stratum is found in On the Nature of the Woman and On the Diseases of Women II. Generation and On the Nature of the Child constitute a single work by a late-fifth-century author, who may also be identified as the author of On Diseases IV and of sections of On the Diseases of Women I. The latest layer is On Sterile Women, which was composed after the other gynecological treatises were in existence.

A single fourth-century author probably wrote On Fistulae and On Hemorrhoids.

Author Susan Wise Bauer writes that, because it explains disease "without blaming or invoking the gods", the Corpus is "the first surviving book of science".

== Content ==
The Hippocratic Corpus contains textbooks, lectures, research, notes and philosophical essays on various subjects in medicine, in no particular order. These works were written for different audiences, both specialists and laymen, and were sometimes written from opposing view points; significant contradictions can be found between works in the Corpus.

=== Case histories ===
One significant portion of the corpus is made up of case histories. Books I and III of Epidemics contain forty-two case histories, of which 60% (25) ended in the patient's death. Nearly all of the diseases described in the Corpus are endemic diseases: colds, consumption, pneumonia, etc.

=== Theoretical and methodological reflections ===
In several texts of the corpus, the ancient physicians develop theories of illness, sometimes grappling with the methodological difficulties that lie in the way of effective and consistent diagnosis and treatment. As scholar Jacques Jouanna writes, "One of the great merits of the physicians of the Hippocratic Corpus is that they are not content to practice medicine and to commit their experience to writing, but that they have reflected on their own activity".

==== Reason and experience ====
While the approaches range from empiricism to a rationalism reminiscent of the physical theories of the pre-Socratic philosophers, these two tendencies can exist side-by-side: "The close association between knowledge and experience is characteristic of the Hippocratics," despite "the Platonic attempt to drive a wedge between the two".

The author of On Ancient Medicine launches immediately into a critique of opponents who posit a single "cause in all cases" of disease, "having laid down as a hypothesis for their account hot or cold or wet or dry or anything else they want". The method put forward in this treatise "could certainly be characterized as an empirical one", preferring the effects of diet as observed by the senses to cosmological speculations, and it was seized upon by Hellenistic Empiricist doctors for this reason. However, "unlike the Empiricists, the author does not claim that the doctor's knowledge is limited to what can be observed by the senses. On the contrary, he requires the doctor to have quite extensive knowledge of aspects of the human constitution that cannot be observed directly, such as the state of the patient's humors and internal organs".

==== Epistemology and the scientific status of medicine ====
The author of The Art is at pains to defend the status of medicine as an art (techne), against opponents who (perhaps following Protagoras' critique of expert knowledge) claim it produces no better results against disease than chance (an attack served by the fact that doctors refused to treat the serious and difficult cases they judged to be incurable by their art). The treatise may be considered "the first attempt at general epistemology bequeathed to us by antiquity", although this may only be because we have lost fifth-century rhetorical works that took a similar approach.

For this writer, as for the author of On the Places in Man, the art of medicine has been wholly discovered. While for the author of On the Places in Man "the principles discovered in it clearly have very little need of good luck", the author of The Art acknowledges the practical limitations that arise in the therapeutic application of these principles. Likewise for the author of On Regimen, the "knowledge and discernment of the nature of man in general—knowledge of its primary constituents and discernment of the components by which it is controlled" may be completely worked out, and yet in practice it is difficult to determine and apply the correct and proportionate diet and exercise to the individual patient.

==== Humours ====
The Hippocratic Corpus explains diseases using the Four Humours in which are described a Phlegm, Yellow Bile, Blood and Black Bile. These medical writings associated each of the humours with a specific organ which goes as follows; blood with the heart, yellow bile with the liver, black bile with the spleen and phlegm with the brain. With each humour, there were specific properties that applied to changes in the fluids such as blood is hot and moist, phlegm is cold and moist, yellow bile is hot and dry and black bile is cold and dry. The authors of the Hippocratic Corpus described that these four humors play a very important role in our health as when there is a little or too much of one of the humours, a disease might occur.

==== Mental Illness ====
The most controversial elements of health and disease during the BC time was the issue of mental illnesses as it was always related to a higher power punishment or demonic nature. The Hippocratic Corpus employed many new vocabulary words to describe mental ailments that coincided with intensity, duration or severity and used these terms to scale from mildest to the strongest form.

==== Natural vs. divine causality ====
Whatever their disagreements, the Hippocratic writers agree in rejecting divine and religious causes and remedies of disease in favor of natural mechanisms. Hippocratic medicine had been formulated to hold true to the belief that "medicine should be practiced as a scientific discipline based on the natural sciences, diagnosing and preventing disease as well as treating them." This not only influenced the relevance of heaven in medicine, and the church's influence on the practice of medicine, but also the relevance of astronomy and cosmology in medicine as a science. Greek tragedy encouraged the spread of false knowledge about the divine origin of human diseases. Greek gods were placed on a pedestal, and seen as healers as a result. To combat this view of diseases, Hippocratic physicians restricted their diagnoses to rational causes and rejected anthropomorphic intervention as the cause and solution of medical issues. In addition to Greek poetry and tragedy, magicians, charlatans, and purifiers can also be considered responsible for the widespread of 'sacred' explanations. Doing this allowed them to step in and provide inefficacious remedies that could convince the gods to intervene and fix these sacred issues experienced by individuals. Thus On the Sacred Disease considers that epilepsy (the so-called "sacred" disease) "has a natural cause, and its supposed divine origin is due to men's inexperience and to their wonder at its peculiar character." The treatise On the Sacred Disease argues that the brain is the source of sensation and intelligence, the locus classicus of the Greek cephalocentric hypothesis. An exception to this rule is found in Dreams (Regime IV), in which prayers to the gods are prescribed alongside more typically Hippocratic interventions. Though materialistic determinism goes back in Greek thought at least to Leucippus, "One of the greatest virtues of the physicians of the Hippocratic Collection is to have stated, in its most universal form, what was later to be called the principle of determinism. All that occurs has a cause. It is in the treatise of The Art that the most theoretical statement of this principle is to be found: 'Indeed, under a close examination spontaneity disappears; for everything that occurs will be found to do so through something [dia ti].'" In a famous passage of On Ancient Medicine, the author insists on the importance of knowledge of causal explanations: "It is not sufficient to learn simply that cheese is a bad food, as it gives a pain to one who eats a surfeit of it; we must know what the pain is, the reasons for it [dia ti], and which constituent of man is harmfully affected."

=== Natural approach to health and wellness ===
The writers of the treatises in the Hippocratic Corpus emphasized a natural approach to health and wellness. During the Asclepius paradigm, Hippocrates used a natural way to treat disease. These natural approaches emphasized the importance of the harmony between the human body and the environment in which we live in. Writings in the Hippocratic Corpus also emphasized the importance of realizing how the environment might cause diseases. Treating diseases with a natural approach is also a topic that can be found in the Hippocratic Corpus. Hippocratic tradition also found that it is important to understand the causes of physiological factors and how these physiological factors hold a therapeutic significance. To add to the natural approach of health and wellness, Hippocratic tradition also emphasized that the mind, body, and spirit were all independent of one another.

=== Health Promotion and the Olympic Games ===
Health promotion was another topic found in the treatises of the Hippocratic Corpus. To promote the well-being of students and their physical and mental health in schools, physical activity was conducted as a necessary activity that allowed the student's physical health to be the best it could be. An example of health promotion being used can be found during the Olympic games. One example of health promotion being used during the Olympic games was olive oil being used to warm up athletes' body temperatures so that they could perform to the best of their abilities. Ancient greeks believed that it was essential to have a harmony between the body and the mind. This led to the idea of a "Healthy mind in a Healthy Body" which is a common phrase that people might hear.

Food was another topic of health promotion in the Hippocratic Corpus. These writings discussed that in order for food to be beneficial to the health of one, the source should be adapted to human nature and food is defined as more forceful or less forceful properties. It was explained in the Hippocratic Corpus that to avoid a diet that was too forceful we must implement cooking and mixing as this was already a type of medicine that can help ease the cause of suffering, illness and death. It has been discovered that during the Olympic games, figs and other fruits were given to the athletes so that the high concentration of glucose in the food would give them the energy they needed to compete to the best of their ability.

=== Medical ethics and manners ===
The duties of the physician are an object of the Hippocratic writers' attention. The series of texts composing the Corpus educates readers on the practices of identifying symptoms in patients, diagnosis, prognosis, treatments, ethics, and bedside manner. In Ancient Greece, being a man of high morals went hand in hand with being a morally just physician. A famous maxim (Epidemics I.11) advises: "As to diseases, make a habit of two things—to help, or at least to do no harm."

The most famous work in the Hippocratic Corpus is the Hippocratic Oath, a landmark declaration of medical ethics. The Hippocratic Oath is both philosophical and practical; it not only deals with abstract principles but practical matters such as removing stones and aiding one's teacher financially. It is a complex and probably not the work of one man. It remains in use, though rarely in its original form.

The preamble of On the Physician offers "a physical and moral portrait of the ideal physician", and the Precepts also concern the physician's conduct. Treatises such as On Joints and Epidemics VI are concerned with the provision of such "courtesies" as providing a patient with cushions during a procedure, and Decorum includes advice on good manners to be observed in the doctor's office or when visiting patients.

=== Urology ===
With many books incorporating different urology practices and observations and nearly 30 works in the Hippocratic book collection entitled Aphorism seemingly solely dedicated to urology in general, urology was one subject that was thoroughly investigated. Seemingly, the main and most problematic topic covered in urology was that of bladder disease in patients, especially when urinary tract stones (that is, stones within either the kidneys or the bladder) were present. Urinary tract stones, in general, have been seen within records all throughout history, even as far back as the ancient days of Egypt. Theorizing how these urinary tract stones formed, how to detect them and other bladder issues, and the controversy on how to treat them were all major investigating points to the authors of the Hippocratic Corpus.

==== Stone formation theories ====
Throughout the books of the Hippocratic Corpus, there are varying hypotheses as to reasons why and exactly how urinary tract stones actually formed. It is noted that these hypotheses were all based on the use of uroscopy and observation of patients by doctors of the time.

- Within the work On the Nature of Man, suggest that the bladder stones first form within or attached to the aorta, much like any other tumor-like object would. In this place, the stone will essentially form pus. Afterward, this stone formation is transported by the blood vessels and forced into the bladder where urine will also be transported.
- In another work, On Airs, Waters, Places, it is suggested that drinking water can attribute to urinary tract stones. If water consumed consists of a mixture of more than one water sources, the water is of impure quality. The different waters are in conflict with one another and therefore produce deposits of sediment. The accumulation of these deposits within the urinary tract due to drinking the waters can then result in urinary tract stones.
- Additionally in On Airs, Waters, Places, another passage describes that formation of urinary tract stones will occur when urine cannot flow through the system easily and causes the sediment in the urine to collect in one area and meld, forming a stone. This can occur when inflammation occurs within the part of the bladder leading to the urethra. When the stone forms at this point, it can block flow and, therefore, cause pain. In this scenario, it was hypothesized that males are more likely to form stones than females due to the anatomy of the bladder.

==== Detecting bladder disease/stones ====
The main mechanism of detecting bladder disease's symptoms, including inflammation and urinary tract stone formations, is through the appearance of the urine itself and the changes that occur with the urine over time. In Aphorism, it was simply stated that as the appearance of urine diverges more and more from the appearance of "healthy" urine, the more likely it is to be diseased and the worse the disease becomes.

In Aphorism works, it was noted that urine lacking color could indicate diseases of the brain – some today think that this author who made this statement was meaning to refer to chronic renal failure or even diabetes. It was also suggested that the appearance of blood within urine could indicate vessels of the kidney to have burst, potentially due to necrosis of blood arteries or vessels. Furthermore, doctors noted that if bubbles formed on top of urine, the kidneys were diseased and showed the potential of long-lasting disease.

==== Treatment of bladder disease/stones ====
When it comes to the treatment of urinary tract stones, many solutions were suggested, including drinking a lot of a water/wine mixture, taking strong medication, or trying different positions when trying to flush them out.

Extracting the urinary tract stones was another option; however, this method was not utilized very often due to its serious risks and possible complications of cutting into the bladder. Other than leakage of urine into the body cavity, another common complication was that of the cells of the testes dying due to the spermatic cord inadvertently being cut during the procedure.

In fact, due to these and other complications and the lack of antiseptics and pain medicines, the Hippocratic Oath opted for the avoidance of surgery – unless absolutely necessary – especially when concerning surgeries that dealt with the urinary tract and more so when stone removal was the intent. Although, the urinary tract stone removal was not a necessary surgery and it appeared to be avoided in most cases, some argue that the Hippocratic Oath only wards of these procedures if the doctor holding the knife is inexperienced in that area. This idea puts forth the development of medical specialties – that is, doctors focusing on one particular area of medicine versus studying the wide array of material that is medicine. The doctors whom have become experts in the urinary tract – whom we would call urologists today – are those that could perform the heightened risk procedure of stone removal. With this reliance on specialized doctors of the urinary tract, some believe that urology itself was the first definable expertise of medical history.

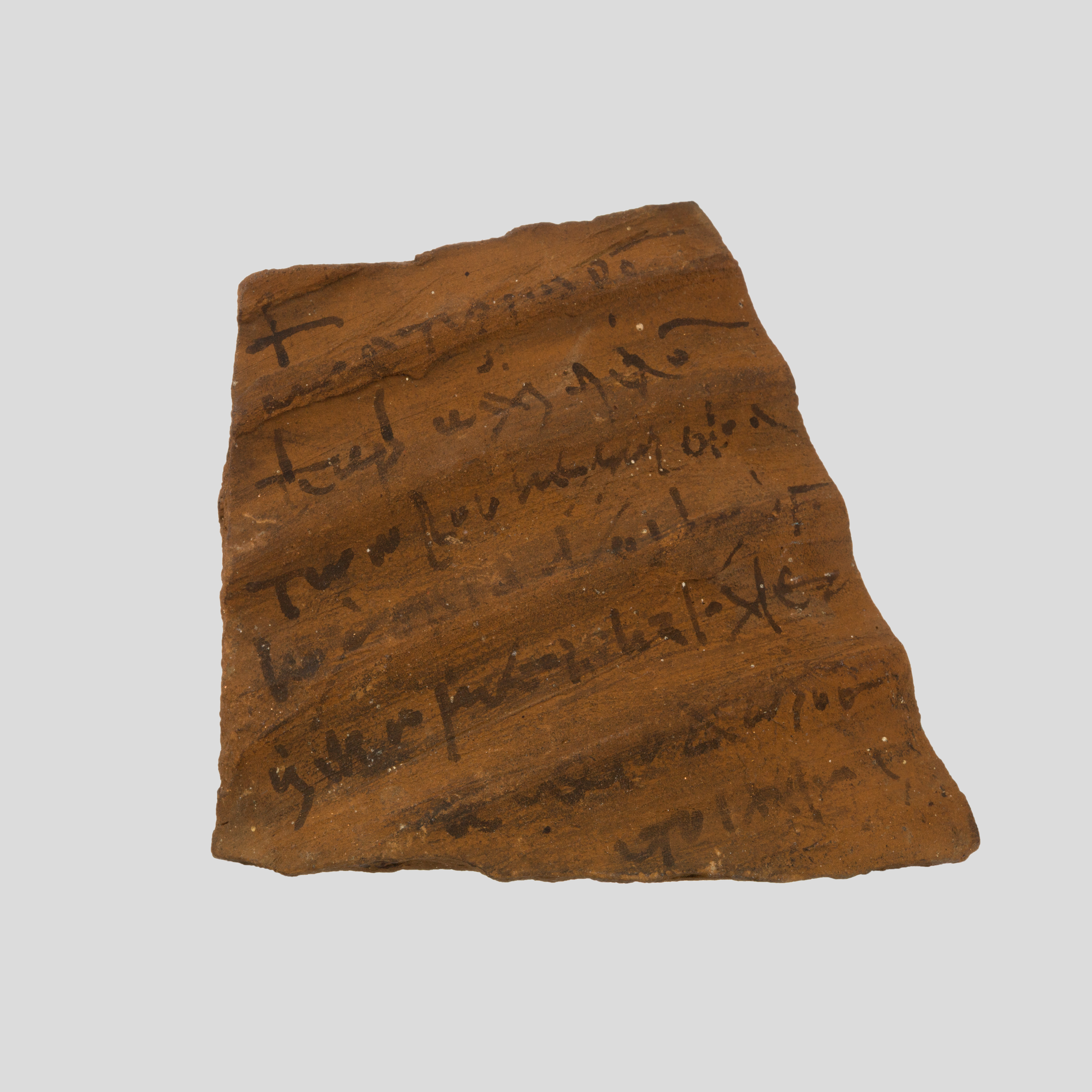
Greek ostrakon

=== Wine ===
References to wine can be found throughout Greek antiquity in both dramas and medical texts. The Hippocratic texts describe wine as a powerful substance, that when consumed in excess can cause physical disorders, today known as intoxication. Although the negative effects of wine on the human body are documented within the Hippocratic Corpus, the author or authors maintain an objective attitude towards wine. During this time, those studying medicine were interested in the physical effects of wine, therefore no medical text condemned the use of wine in excess. According to the Hippocratic text, the consumption of wine significantly affects two regions of the body: the head and the lower body cavity. Excessive drinking can cause heaviness of the head and pain in the head, in addition to disturbances in thought. In the lower body cavity, excess wine ingestion can have a purging effect; it can be the source of stomach pain, diarrhea, and vomiting. This stomach pain was more common among athletes because of their intense diets composed mainly of meat and wine. An overall effect of wine that all Greek doctors of the time observed and agreed on was its warming property. Therefore, wine's properties are described as "hot and dry." As documented in the Hippocratic texts, extreme use of wine can result in death.

Physicians tried to study the human body with pure objectivity to give the most accurate explanation for the effects of external substances that could be given for the time. During this period, physicians believed not all wines were equally potent in producing a range of perilous symptoms. According to the Hippocratic texts, physicians carefully categorized wine by properties such as color, taste, viscosity, smell, and age. According to Hippocrates, a more concentrated wine leads to a heavy head and difficulty thinking, and a soft wine inflames the spleen and liver and produces wind in the intestine. Other observations of the ingestion of wine included the varying levels of tolerance within the population being observed. This observation led to the belief that the size of one's body and one's environment had an influence on ability to handle wine. Because of this, different people would require different concentrations and dilutions of wine for medicinal use. After observation, men with larger bodies were able to consume more than men with smaller bodies and the same effects could be observed between them. Physician's also hypothesized that gender contributed to the effects of wine on the body. Women were noted to have a cold and wet nature which encouraged Hippocratic doctors to prescribe them undiluted wine. This differed from men, who typically were hotter by nature. It was not common practice between physicians of the time to recommend the consumption of wine for children. Physicians collectively believed that there was no purpose for children to drink wine. However, in rare circumstances, there are records of some doctors recommending wine for children, only if heavily diluted with water, to warm the child or to ease hunger pangs. Mostly, doctors prohibited wine consumption for people under eighteen.

Greek physicians were very interested in observing and recording the effects of wine and intoxication, the excessive use of wine was well known to be harmful, however, it was also documented as a useful remedy. Several of the Hippocratic texts list the properties and use of foods consumed during 5th century BC. Wine was first defined as a food by all doctors. Directions for consumption varied based on gender, season, and other events in daily life. Men were encouraged to consume dark, undiluted wine before copulation, not to the point of intoxication, however enough to provide power and guarantee strength to the fetus. Because of wine's visual similarity to blood, physicians had assumed a relationship between the two substances. For this reason, men with cardiac illness, lack of strength, or pale complexion were encouraged to consume dark, undiluted wine. Multiple texts within the Hippocratic Corpus advise the use of wine in accordance with the seasons. During the winter, wine must be undiluted, to counter the cold and wet, because wine's properties are dry and hot. During fall and spring, wine should be moderately diluted, and during the summer, wine should be diluted as much as possible with water, because of the hot temperatures. The practice of mixing wine and diluting wine is also seen in prescription form, however, the dosage and quantities are left to the doctor. The prescription of wine as a treatment was prohibited with diseases that affected the head, brain, and those accompanied by a fever. Wine could also be used as an external remedy by mixing it with other substances such as honey, milk, water, or oil to make salves or soaks. Patients with pneumonia like illnesses would soak in a wine mixture and breath in the vapors with the intent to expel the pus from their lungs. Wine was frequently prescribed as a topical remedy for sores because of its drying effect.

=== Epidemics 1 ===
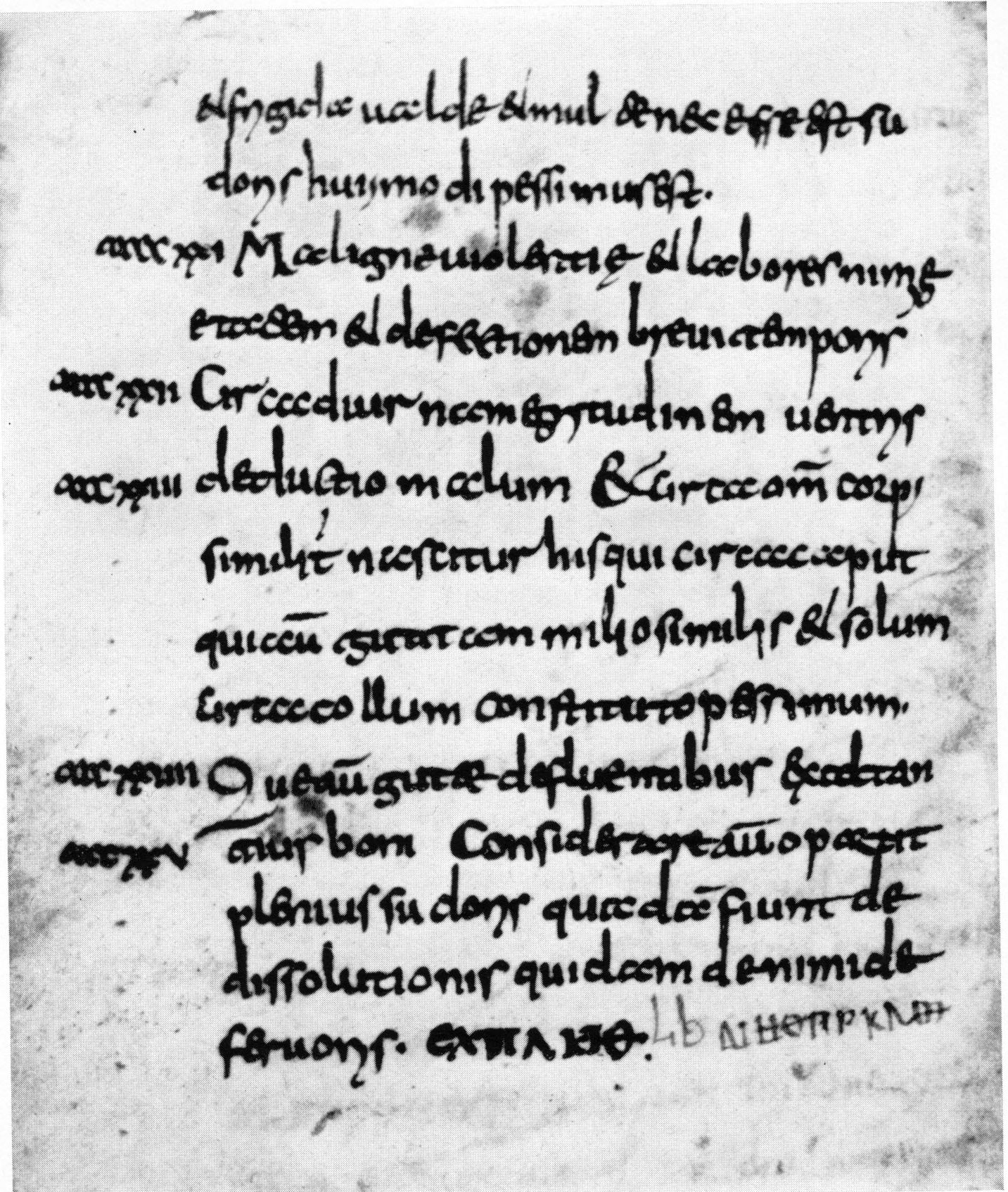
Text from the section Aphorisms in the Hippocratic Corpus

Epidemics 1 begins by describing each season's characteristics. It states that autumn has strong south winds and many rainy days. Winter had south winds with the occasional north wind and droughts. Spring was southerly and cold with slight rain. Summer was cloudy and did not rain.

It then described diseases associated with each season. For example, in spring many people began having mild fevers which, in some cases, caused hemorrhage. The hemorrhage was rarely fatal. Swelling next to both ears was also common. Coughs and sore throats accompanied the other symptoms. Based on modern knowledge, this disease was mumps, which causes salivary glands under the ears to swell. It is remarkable that this ancient work describes symptoms so vividly that modern doctors can diagnose the cause a thousand years later. This section of the Hippocratic Corpus assumes that when looking at human disease and the health of humans, you must look at the seasons, winds and orientation of places, the nature of the water, the nature of the soil and the lifestyle of the inhabitants of a particular city.

Epidemics 1 goes on to describe the climate on two occasions and the diseases associated with them, called constitutions. The symptoms described include more serious, sometimes lethal, fevers, eye infections, and dysentery.

=== On Diseases ===
Jaundice is a disease that is mentioned numerous times throughout and is described as occurring in five ways. Jaundice is when the skin or eyes turn yellow. The Greek physicians thought of Jaundice to be a disease itself rather than what medical professionals know now to be a symptom of various other diseases. The Greeks also believed that there were five kinds of jaundice that can occur and report the differences between them.

The first kind can quickly turn fatal. The skin appears to be green. The analogy made in the text is that the skin is greener than a green lizard. The patient will have fevers, shiver, and the skin becomes very sensitive. In the mornings, sharp pains occur in the abdominal region. If the patient survives more than two weeks, they have a chance of recovery. The treatments suggest drinking a mixture of milk and other nuts and plants in the morning and at night. The second form develops only during the summer because it was believed the heat of the sun causes bile, a dark green fluid produced by the liver, to rest underneath the skin. This causes a yellowish color to the skin, and pale eyes and urine. The scalp also develops a crusty substance. The treatment calls for several baths a day on top of the mixture mentioned in the first remedy. Surviving past two weeks with this form of jaundice was rare. In two other forms of this disease, occurring during the winter, set in due to drunkenness, chills, and the excess production of phlegm. The last form is the least fatal and most common. It is associated with eating and drinking too much. The symptoms include yellow eyes and skin, fever, headache, and weakness. The treatment however, is very different from the rest. The physician will draw blood from the elbows, and advise to take hot baths, drink cucumber juice, and induce vomiting to clear the bowels. If the treatment is followed, a full recovery is possible. The several forms of jaundice that the Greek physicians proclaimed might be because jaundice occurs due to varying sicknesses like hepatitis, gallstones and tumors. The diverse set of symptoms were probably the effects of the sicknesses rather than the jaundice itself.

=== Empyemas ===
An empyema is a Greek word derived from the word empyein which means "pus-producing". According to the Hippocratic Corpus, they can occur in the thorax, the uterus, the bladder, the ear, and other parts of the body. However, the writings indicate that the thorax was the most common and provided more description. Physicians at the time thought that the cause of an empyema was by orally ingesting some form of foreign body where it will enter the lungs. This could be done by inhaling or drinking the foreign body. The physicians also thought that empyemas could occur after parapneumonic infections or pleurisy because the chest has not recovered from those illnesses. Parapneumonic infections can be tied to modern pneumonia which can still be fatal.

There are many symptoms associated with an empyema ranging from mild to severe. The most common ones are fever, thoracic pain, sweating, heaviness in the chest, and a cough. Treating an empyema was primarily done using herbal remedies or non-invasive treatments. Mostly mixtures of plants and organic matter were drunk or bathed in. There are a few extreme cases in which invasive procedures were performed and mentioned in detail. One of these treatments included the patient behind held down in a chair while the physician cut between the ribs with a scalpel and inserted a drainage tube which would remove all of the pus. The research and descriptions that the Greek physicians performed were so accurate that they were the foundation of what we know about empyemas today.

=== Dermatology ===
The Hippocratic Corpus provides valuable guidance for dermatology and the diagnosis of skin diseases or infections. Hippocrates described multiple dermatologic diseases, specifically in neonatal and pediatrics. These diseases included intertrigo, lichenoid eruptions, vitiligo, furuncle, leprosy, papulosquamous disease, skin reactions to specific medications, skin reactions to mosquito bites, warts, scabies, and impetigo. Along with the variety of skin diseases described in the Hippocratic Corpus is the suggested treatment. These treatments stem from the belief that dermatologic diseases were a result of imbalance in body humors.

For relief from various dermatologic conditions, the Hippocratic text recommends spring water or seawater baths and topical application of a fatty substance as a form of treatment. For intertrigo, or infant chafing, myrrh oil and litharge were powerful astringent compounds that were recommended as a form of treatment. For lichenoid skin conditions, vinegar, steam baths, pumice stones, and manna (sugar substance derived from mica thuris plant) were recommended to treat this skin disease. The Hippocratic text also offers sulfur as a treatment for lichenoid, which has a strong antibacterial effect that is still prescribed in dermatologic medications today. For leprosy and vitiligo, lime water and concentrated vinegar are recommended by the Hippocratic Corpus to treat these conditions.

Many of these forms of treatment proposed in the Hippocratic Corpus are utilized today for dermatologic infections. Modern medicine makes use of sulfur as an antibacterial compound, spring water has shown effective benefits when treating skin diseases, and oil-based products such as myrrh oil and litharge are used as ointments to treat intertrigo, eczemas, and skin lesions. When reflecting on the treatments of skin diseases and infections in the Hippocratic Corpus, it is evident that some of the approaches when applied to modern dermatology are still valid.

=== Conception ===
The Hippocratic Corpus contains many contributions from across the medical field including notes on conception. Some of these contributions were put into two sections of the corpus called Diseases of Women I and Diseases of Women II. The sections go into detail on concepts such as abortion, obstetrical notes, and early forms of gynecology.

==== Lack of fertility ====
The Diseases of Women details that an infertile woman with a low menstruation rate may have a bent cervix that essentially blocks the pathway. It offers a few treatments in the way of treating a bent cervix depending on how the generating seed is washed down and the length of time it takes for that to happen. Options are offered for treating the uterus, head, and body depending on the observation of the seed.

==== Menses ====
Menses is another way of wording menstruation or blood flow discharge from the uterus. There are multiple sections within the works dedicated to different types of menses along with their understood meanings of the time. There is a large portion dedicated to what a doctor should expect of standard menses along with some slight variations.

Within the Diseases of Women I, the average amount of menses for healthy women should be somewhere around a half pint for around two-three days.

The flow itself is considered to require the viewers judgment but does go on to say that it should flow like a blood from a sacrificial lamb, indicating the timeframe of the work, and that the blood should coagulate readily. The health of an individual or even their likelihood of pregnancy was remarked upon by evaluating the length of the menstruation. A menstruation period longer than four days was thought to be an indicator of more delicate embryos. Less than three days is said to indicate robust and healthy individuals but would lead to likely infertility.

==== Complications of childbirth ====
The lochia and its presence is noted along with other possible complications after childbirth. Uterus sensitivity, lower back pain, aches across the body, swelling, and chills are all noted to be expected. Fever is the outlier that have different treatments based on the treaty.

Bathing with oils along with lily oil rubbed on the woman's head is recommended. Oil should also be applied to her uterus. Vapor baths in general are the main focus for treatment after childbirth.

The change with a fever is to avoid bathing. Vapor treatment with an application using a hot towel is recommended on her lower stomach and back. A diet of boiled meal with rue or barley gruel is recommended seemingly for with or without a fever.

A paragraph is dedicated to the experience in childbirth of the woman in question affecting the post childbirth reactions. Women are noted to not have an understanding of what sickness they may have or the pride of the woman causing her to not discuss their symptoms. The paragraph pleads for doctors themselves to be well-versed in the possible post-birth diseases that women may have and know how to spot it themselves.

== Style ==
The writing style of the Corpus has been remarked upon for centuries, being described by some as, "clear, precise, and simple". It is often praised for its objectivity and conciseness, yet some have criticized it as being "grave and austere". Francis Adams, a translator of the Corpus, goes further and calls it sometimes "obscure". Of course, not all of the Corpus is of this "laconic" style, though most of it is. It was Hippocratic practice to write in this style.

The whole corpus is written in Ionic Greek, though the island of Cos was in a region that spoke Doric Greek.

The Art and On Breaths show the influence of Sophistic rhetoric; they "are characterized by long introductions and conclusions, antitheses, anaphoras, and sound effects typical of Gorgianic style". Other works also have rhetorical elements. In general, it can be said that "the Hippocratic physician was also an orator", with his role including public speeches and "verbal wrestling matches".

== Printed editions ==
The entire Hippocratic Corpus was first printed as a unit in 1525. This edition was in Latin and was edited by Marcus Fabius Calvus in Rome. The first complete Greek edition followed the next year from the Aldine Press in Venice. A significant edition was that of Émile Littré who spent twenty-two years (1839–1861) working diligently on a complete Greek edition and French translation of the Hippocratic Corpus. This was scholarly, yet sometimes inaccurate and awkward. Another edition of note was that of Franz Zacharias Ermerins, published in Utrecht between 1859 and 1864. Kühlewein's Teubner edition (1894–1902) "mark[ed] a distinct advance".

Beginning in 1967, an important modern edition by Jacques Jouanna and others began to appear (with Greek text, French translation, and commentary) in the Collection Budé. Other important bilingual annotated editions (with translation in German or French) continue to appear in the Corpus medicorum graecorum published by the Berlin-Brandenburgische Akademie der Wissenschaften.

=== English translations ===
The first English translation from the Hippocratic Corpus, Peter Lowe's Chirurgerie ("Surgery"), was published in 1597, but a complete English translation of a dozen and a half "genuine" works was not offered in English until Francis Adams' publication of 1849. Other works of the corpus remained untranslated into English until the resumed publication of the Loeb Classical Library edition beginning in 1988. The first four Loeb volumes were published in 1923–1931, and seven further volumes between 1988 and 2012.

== List of works of the Corpus ==
(Ordering from Adams 1891, pp. 40–105; LCL = vols. of the Loeb Classical Library edition)

Possibly genuine works of Hippocrates

1. On Ancient Medicine or Tradition in Medicine (LCL 1)
2. Prognostics (LCL 2)
3. Aphorisms (LCL 4)
4. Epidemics I and III (LCL 1)
5. On Regimen in Acute Diseases (LCL 2, 6)
6. On Airs, Waters, and Places (LCL 1)
7. On the Sacred Disease (LCL 2)
8. On the Articulations or On Joints (LCL 3)
9. On Fractures (LCL 3)
10. On the Instruments of Reduction or Mochlicon (LCL 3)
11. On Injuries of the Head (LCL 3)
12. The Hippocratic Oath (LCL 1)
13. The Law or The Canon (LCL 2)
14. The Physician's Establishment or Surgery (LCL 3)

Works of Polybus

1. On the Nature of Man (LCL 4)
2. Regimen in Health (LCL 4)

Works predating Hippocrates

1. Prorrhetics I (LCL 8)
2. The Coan Praenotions (LCL 9)

Works of the age or spirit of Hippocrates

1. Prorrhetics II (LCL 8)
2. On Ulcers (LCL 8)
3. On Fistulae (LCL 8)
4. On Hemorrhoids (LCL 8)
5. On Airs or Breaths or Of the Pneuma (LCL 2)
6. On the Places in Man (LCL 8)
7. The Art or The Science of Medicine (LCL 2)
8. On Regimen (LCL 4)
9. On Dreams (LCL 4)
10. On Affections (LCL 5)
11. On Internal Affections (LCL 6)
12. On Diseases (LCL 5, 6, 10)
13. On the Seventh Month's Foetus (LCL 9)
14. On the Eighth Month's Foetus (LCL 9)
15. Epidemics II, IV–VII (LCL 7)
16. On the Humors (LCL 4)
17. On the Use of Liquids (LCL 8)

Gynecological works

1. On Semen or Generation or On Intercourse (LCL 10)
2. On the Nature of the Child or Pregnancy (LCL 10)
3. On the Diseases of Women (LCL 11)
4. On Sterile Women or Barrenness (LCL 10)
5. On the Diseases of Young Women or Girls (LCL 9)
6. On Superfoetation (LCL 9)
7. On the Nature of the Woman (LCL 10)

Post-Hippocratic works (age of Aristotle and Praxagoras)

1. On the Heart (LCL 9)
2. On Aliment or Nutriment (LCL 1)
3. On Fleshes (LCL 8)
4. On the Weeks or On Hebdomads or On Sevens (survives completely only in Latin translations: text Roscher 1913)
5. On the Glands (LCL 8)
6. On the Veins (an excerpt from On the Nature of the Bones, LCL 9)

Late and dubious works

1. On the Physician (LCL 2, 8)
2. On Decorum or On Honorable Conduct (LCL 2)
3. Precepts (LCL 1)
4. On Anatomy or On Dissection (LCL 9)
5. On Dentition (LCL 2)
6. On the Excision of the Foetus (LCL 9)
7. On Vision (LCL 9)
8. On the Nature of the Bones (LCL 9)
9. On the Crises (LCL 9)
10. On Critical Days (LCL 9)
11. On Purgative Medicines or Remedies (not in Littré or LCL editions: text Schöne 1920–1924)
12. Letters and Speeches (Hippocrates: Pseudepigraphic Writings, Leiden: Brill, 1990)

== See also ==
- Huangdi Neijing, a work of comparable importance in Chinese medicine, published during the same time period
