= Aretaeus of Cappadocia =

2nd century Greek physician

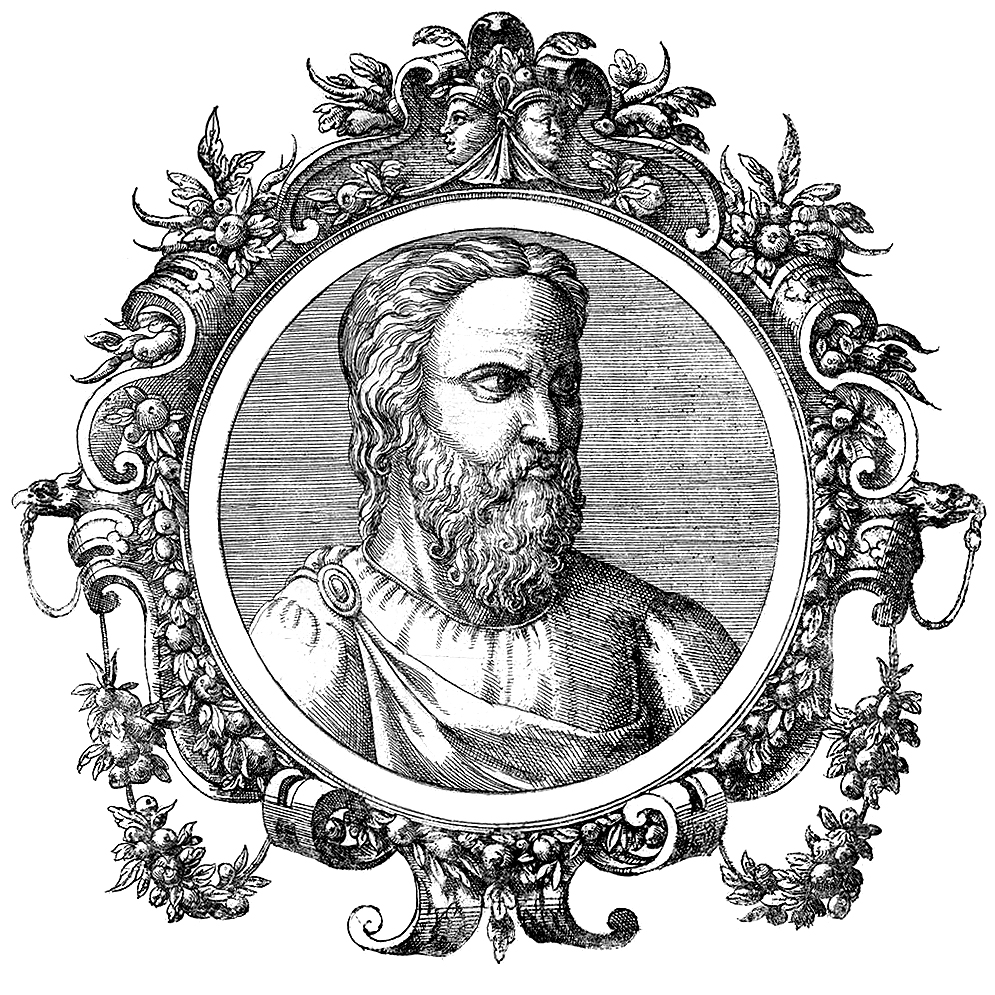
- Born: Ἀρεταῖος
- Occupation: Physician
- Years active: 2nd century AD

Aretaeus (Ancient Greek: Ἀρεταῖος) is one of the most celebrated of the ancient Greek physicians. Little is known of his life. He was ethnically Greek, born in the Roman province of Cappadocia, Asia Minor (modern day Turkey), and most likely lived in the second half of the second century AD. He is generally styled "the Cappadocian" (Καππάδοξ).

== Diagnostic method ==
Aretaeus wrote in Ionic Greek. His eight treatises on diseases, which are still extant, are considered to be among the most important Greco-Roman medical works ever written. His valuable work displays great accuracy in the detail of symptoms, and in seizing the diagnostic character of diseases. In his practice he followed for the most part the method of Hippocrates, but he paid less attention to what have been styled "the natural actions" of the system; and, contrary to the practice of the Father of Medicine, he did not hesitate to attempt to counteract them, when they appeared to him to be injurious.

Aretaeus offered clinical descriptions of a number of diseases among which he gave classic accounts of asthma, epilepsy, pneumonia, tetanus, uterine cancer, liver cancer, and different kinds of insanity. He differentiated nervous diseases and mental disorders and described hysteria, headaches, mania and melancholia. Some of his thinking about neurological disorders anticipated 19th and 20th century notions. He wrote the first known description of coeliac disease, naming it disease of the abdomen, koiliakos. He also wrote the first known description of diabetes.

The account which Aretaeus gives of his treatment of various diseases indicates a simple and sagacious system, and one of more energy than that of the professed Methodici. Thus he freely administered active purgatives; he did not object to narcotics; he was much less averse to bleeding; and upon the whole his Materia Medica was both ample and efficient.

It may be asserted generally that there are few of the ancient physicians, since the time of Hippocrates, who appear to have been less biased by attachment to any peculiar set of opinions, and whose account of the phenomena and treatment of disease has better stood the test of subsequent experience. Aretaeus is placed by some writers among the Pneumatici because he maintained the doctrines which are peculiar to this sect; other systematic writers, however, think that he is better entitled to be placed with the Eclectics.

== Works ==
Aretaeus' work consists of eight books, two De causis et signis acutorum morborum, two De causis et signis diuturnorum morborum, two De curatione acutorum morborum, and two De curatione diuturnorum morborum. They are in a tolerably complete state of preservation, though a few chapters are lost.

The work was first published in a Latin translation by Junius Paulus Crassus (Giunio Paolo Grassi), Venice 1552, together with Rufus of Ephesus. The first Greek edition is that by Jacobus Goupylus, Paris, 1554, which is more complete than the Latin version of Crassus. In 1723 a major edition in folio was published at the Clarendon Press at Oxford, edited by John Wigan, containing an improved text, a new Latin version, learned dissertations and notes, and a copious index by Michel Maittaire. In 1731, Boerhaave brought out a new edition, of which the text and Latin version had been printed before the appearance of Wigan's; this edition contains annotations by Pierre Petit and Daniel Wilhelm Triller. The edition by C. G. Kühn, Leipzig 1828, included Wigan's text, Latin version, dissertations, etc., together with Petit's commentary, Triller's emendations, and Maittaire's index. An edition by F. Z. Ermerins was published in Utrecht in 1847.

A more recent standard edition is by Karl Hude (1860–1936) in the Corpus medicorum graecorum (2nd ed., Berlin, Akademie-Verlag, 1958, online). The four books De causis et signis have now been issued in an annotated bilingual edition in Greek and French (Arétée de Cappadoce, Des causes et des signes des maladies aiguës et chroniques, trans. R.T.H. Laennec, ed. and comm. Mirko D. Grmek, pref. by Danielle Gourevitch, Geneva, 2000).

== Secondary literature ==
The medical opinions of Aretaeus have been discussed by such scholars as Johann Albert Fabricius, Albrecht von Haller, and Kurt Sprengel. Aretaeus has been treated more recently in a couple of short monographs:

- Karl Deichgräber, Aretaeus von Kappadozien als medizinischer Schriftsteller, Berlin, 1971.
- Fridolf Kudlien, Untersuchungen zu Aretaios von Kappadokien, Mainz, 1964.

For Aretaeus' influence on Giambattista Morgagni, the father of anatomical pathology, see:

- Giorgio Weber, Areteo di Cappadocia: interpretazioni e aspetti della formazione anatomo-patologica del Morgagni, Florence, 1996
