= Attalion =

Attalion (Ancient Greek: Ἀτταλίων) was a physician of ancient Greece who wrote a commentary on the Aphorisms of Hippocrates, which is now lost.

His date is uncertain, as he is mentioned only in the preface to the commentary on the Aphorisms ascribed to Oribasius, who lived in the fourth century CE. However, most scholars consider this ascription to be false, so it is not known with any clarity what century he lived in.
