= Marcus Fabius Calvus =

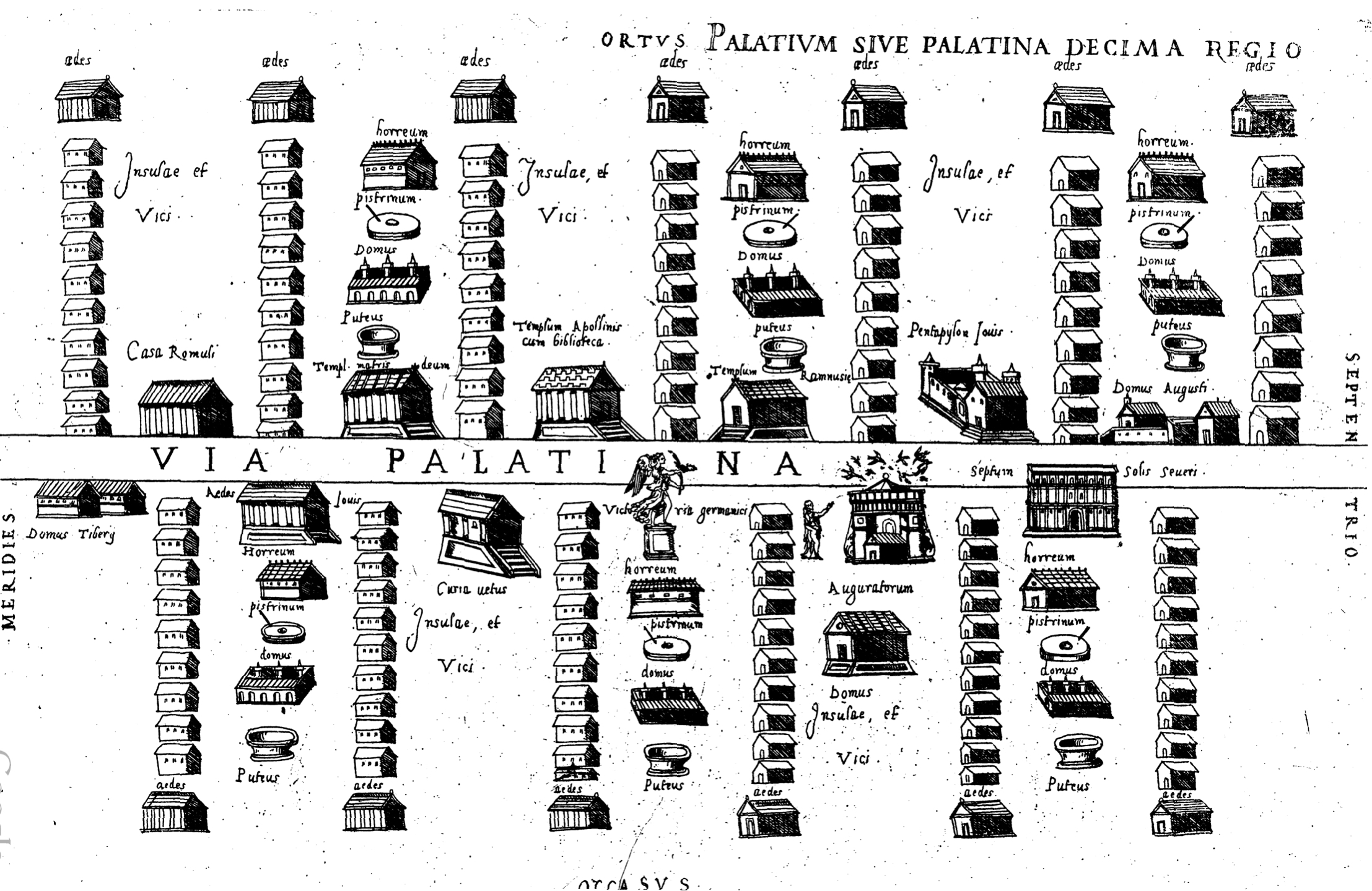
Map of Rome from his Antiquae urbis Romae cum regionibus simulacrum (1527)

Marcus Fabius Calvus (Italian: Marco Fabio Calvo; c. 1440 – 1527) was a Renaissance humanist from Ravenna. His translation of the Hippocratic Corpus into Latin was published at Rome in 1525.

== Bibliography ==
- Gualdo, Riccardo (1993). "Fabio Calvo, Marco". Dizionario Biografico degli Italiani (in Italian). Vol. 43: Enzo–Fabrizi. Rome: Institute of the Italian Encyclopaedia. ISBN 978-88-12-00032-6.
- Rutkow, Ira M. (1993), Surgery: An Illustrated History, London and Southampton: Elsevier Science Health Science div, ISBN 0-8016-6078-5.
