= Apophlegmatism =

Pre-modern chewable medication for phlegm

Apophlegmatisms, in pre-modern medicine, were medications chewed in order to draw away phlegm and humours from the head and brain. Such treatments were called apophlegmatic. Of this kind, tobacco was considered excellent, except for the damage it does to teeth. Sage was said to have almost the same virtues without the same defects.

== Etymology ==
The word comes from the Greek ἀπὸ and φλέγμα ('inflammation, heat').
