= Dyscrasia =

Any of various disorders in medicine

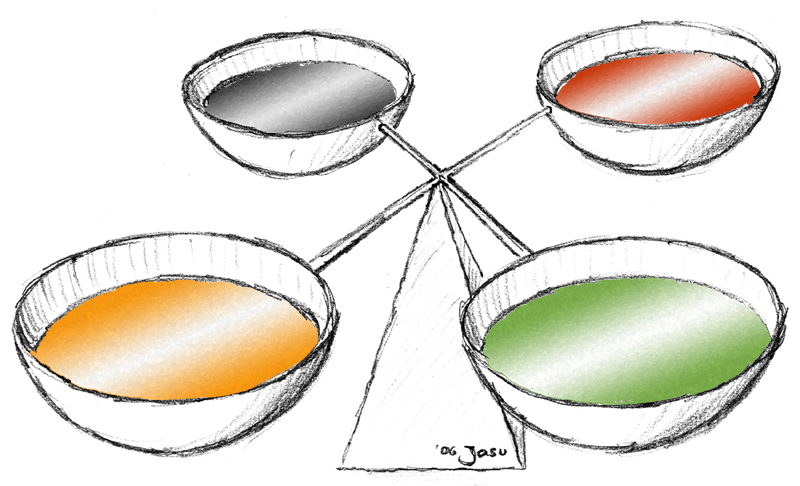
Four humours diagram

In medicine, both ancient and modern, a dyscrasia is any of various disorders. The word has ancient Greek roots meaning "bad mixture". The concept of dyscrasia was developed by the Greek physician Galen (129–216 AD), who elaborated a model of health and disease as a structure of elements, qualities, humors, organs, and temperaments (based on earlier humorism). Health was understood in this perspective to be a condition of harmony or balance among these basic components, called eucrasia. Disease was interpreted as the disproportion of bodily fluids or four humours: phlegm, blood, yellow bile, and black bile. The imbalance was called dyscrasia. In modern medicine, the term is still occasionally used in medical context for an unspecified disorder of the blood, such as a plasma cell dyscrasia.

== Ancient use ==
To the Greeks, it meant an imbalance of the four humors: blood, black bile, yellow bile, and water (phlegm). These humors were believed to exist in the body, and any change in the balance among the four of them was the direct cause of all disease.

This is similar to the concepts of bodily humors in the Tibetan medical tradition and the Indian Ayurvedic system, which both relate health and disease to the equality (Skt. samatā) or inequality (Skt. viṣamatā) of the quantities of three (or four) bodily humors, generally translated as wind, bile, and phlegm (and blood).

== Modern use ==
The term is still occasionally used in medical contexts for an unspecified disorder of the blood. Specifically, it is defined in current medicine as a morbid general state resulting from the presence of abnormal material in the blood, usually applied to diseases affecting blood cells or platelets. Evidence of dyscrasia can be present with a WBC (white blood cell) count of over 1,000,000.

"Plasma cell dyscrasia" is sometimes considered synonymous with paraproteinemia or monoclonal gammopathy.

== See also ==
- Dysthymia and Euthymia (medicine), similar concepts applied to mood
