= Cacochymy =

In the pre-modern medical practice of humorism, cacochymy, or cacochymia, referred to a depraved habit of body, replete with ill humors, from various causes. When the repletion was merely with blood, it was called plethora.

Joannis Gorraeus gave the name cacochymia to the abundance and excess of any ill humor, provided it is only one in excess; plethora he called the abundance or excess of all the humors together.

== See also ==
- Cachexia
