= On the Nature of Man =

Ancient Greek medical text

On the Nature of Man is a work in the Hippocratic Corpus. On the Nature of Man is attributed to Polybus, the son in law and disciple of Hippocrates, through a testimony from Aristotle's History of Animals. However, as with the many other works of the Hippocratic Corpus, the authorship is regarded as dubious in origin.

On the Nature of Man attempts to explain the human body in its anatomy and composition. The content is based on observation and defended by logical explanations of the causes of each disease in order to readily meet outside criticism. It places emphasis on disease not being of divine origin, but rather an imbalance of the four humors (collection of blood, phlegm, black bile, and yellow bile) in the body. This was the first introduction of the theory of four humors which was used to explain and diagnose any disease or ailment as an imbalance of these four humors in the body excluding health issues that arose from an outside source.

== Summary ==
On the Nature of Man shares the general Hippocratic interest in humorism and in such treatments as bloodletting. Bloodletting is the procedure performed in order to regulate the patient's four humors:

"Furthermore, one must know that diseases due to repletion are cured by evacuation, and those due to evacuation are cured by repletion; those due to exercise are cured by rest, and those due to idleness are cured by exercise."

On the Nature of Man gives first hand accounts and explanations of individual medical cases. For example, dysentery and nosebleeds occur in the spring and summer because this is when the blood is at its hottest. Hippocrates concludes that the degree of damage a given disease can do to a person depends on its nature. The most serious of illnesses are those that affect the strongest part of the body. If the strongest part of the body is affected, then the weak parts are easily affected and may cause death. However, if a disease starts in a weak area of the body, often it is curable.

Each humor had its own temperament and nature: Blood being hot and wet, phlegm being cold and wet, black bile being cold and dry, and yellow bile being hot and dry. These matched up each humor with one of the four seasons that had the same characteristics. It was a practice to change one's routine to keep these humors in balance as the weather and seasons changed. The theory of the four humors was its own theory of science and medicine. Even with clear parallels to the theory of the four elements of air, water, fire, and earth they draw no connections to the theory of the four humors. This theory of the four humors known as Humorism was critical in the field of medicine for centuries until it was ultimately replaced by germ theory in the late 1800s.

The lasting impact of On the Nature of Man was extremally significant in the field of medicine and was critical to all the teaching in Hippocratic Corpus. Commentaries by Galen of On the Nature of Man years credit it with being the basis of Hippocratic medicine and gave On the Nature of Man much greater prestige and lasting impact on science and medicine as a whole. It was Galen that added to the theory of the four humors and made it much more fleshed out in his commentary of On the Nature of Man that made the theory of the four humors so prominent and well known and On the Nature Man that started all of these ideas and medical theories.
