= Franz Zacharias Ermerins =

Dutch physician and academic (1808–1871)

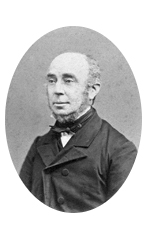
Franz Zacharias Ermerins (1808-1871)

Franz Zacharias Ermerins (also Franciscus, Frans, François) (8 November 1808 in Middelburg – 29 May 1871 in Groningen) was a Dutch medical doctor and medical editor whose literary work encompassed Hippocrates and ancient Greek medicine.

He was born into an eminent Zeeland family in Middelburg. In 1826, he graduated from the Latin school there. After the outbreak of the Belgian Revolution while he was a medical student at Leyden University, he joined the Leidse Jagers, a volunteer company of soldiers drawn from the Leyden student body, and participated in the Ten Days' Campaign. Upon his safe return, he continued his studies. He received a doctoral degree on November 3, 1832, with his thesis de Hippocratis doctrina a prognostice oriunda.

He returned to his native city and practiced as a doctor. He married Barta Antonia van der Feen, with whom he had several children. His practice soon prospered, but he continued his study of his beloved Greek doctors, to which he devoted all the time he could spare from his daytime occupation. In the meantime he was appointed President of the Provincial Medical Commission and Secretary of the Zeeland Provincial Society. In 1839 his love for the classics induced him to move to Paris, to work full-time at the royal library on transcribing and organizing of ancient manuscripts, in particular those of Aretaeus. The next year this resulted in the publication of his Anecdota medica Graeca, followed soon after by additional works.

Upon the death of Professor S. E. Stratingh, he was appointed in his place at the University of Groningen. He took up this appointment on September 12, 1844, with an inaugural lecture entitled de veteris medicorum interpretis munere a medicis non recusando. He lectured on a wide variety of topics in medicine, due to the lack of a sufficient number of professors, a situation which, as Ermerins wrote to a good friend, "benefits neither professors nor students". Beginning in 1852, however, he limited himself to general pathology, pathological anatomy and histology, and clinical courses in the academic hospital. In spite of this busy schedule, he completed after ten years his main work Hippocratis et aliorum medicorum veterum reliquiae, which was published in three volumes by the Royal Netherlands Academy of Arts and Sciences, of which he had been a member since 1855.

Near the end of his life, he was threatened with total blindness; he died of typhoid May 27, 1871.

The French scholar Charles Daremberg called him "one of the glories of medical erudition."

== Bibliography ==
- Dissertatio de Hippocratis doctrina a prognostice oriunda. L.B. 1832 4°. (HathiTrust.)
- Anecdota medica Graeca. Ibid. 1840 (Collection Medic@, Google Books.)
- Hippocratis liber de victus ratione in morbis acutis. Accedunt Observationes criticae in Soranum Ephesium de arte obstetrica morbisque mulierum. L.B. 1841. 8°. (Google Books.)
- Oratio de Veterum medicorum interpretis munere a medicis non recusando (in Annal. Acad. anni 1844). 4°.
- Aretaei Cappadocis quae supersunt. Recensuit et illustravit Franciscus Zacharias Ermerins. Utrecht 1847. (Collection Medic@, HathiTrust)
- Oratio de perpetuis materiae et formae in vita mutabilitate ac motu. Groningae 1851 8°. (et in Annal. Acad. 1851 4°). (Google Books.)
- Hippocratis et aliorum veterum reliquiae. Mandato Acad. Reg. Disc. quae Amstelodami est. Traj. ad Rhen. 1859–1864, 3 vol. 4°. (Collection Medic@.)
- Continuatio epimetri (ipsum epimetrum invenitur in Hippocrat. edit. vol. III. p. XCII- CXLI) ad editionem Hippocratis. Accedunt nonnulla ad Aretaeum; Traj. ad Rhen 1867. (Collection Medic@.)
- Oratio de vetere medicina graeca ante aetatem Alexandrinam (in Annal. Acad. 1865–1866). (Google Books.)
- Sorani Ephesii liber de muliebribus affectionibus. Traj. ad Rhen. 1869. 8°. (Google Books.)
- Epistola critica ad Soranum a se editum. Accedit de vita Ermerinsii editoris epilogus. Utrecht 1872. (Google Books.)
