= Phlegm =

Mucus produced by the respiratory system (excluding the nasal passages)

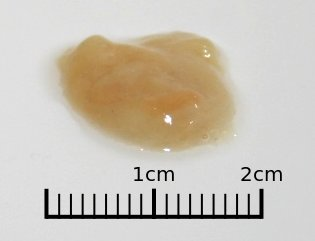
A substance of phlegm

Phlegm (/ˈflɛm/; Ancient Greek: φλέγμα, phlégma, "inflammation", "humour caused by heat") is mucus produced by the respiratory system, excluding that produced by the throat and nose passages. It often refers to respiratory mucus expelled by coughing, otherwise known as sputum. Phlegm, and mucus as a whole, is in essence a water-based gel consisting of glycoproteins, immunoglobulins, lipids and other substances. Its composition varies depending on climate, genetics, and state of the immune system. Its color can vary from transparent to pale or dark yellow and green, from light to dark brown, and even to dark grey depending on the contents. The body naturally produces about 1 quart (about 1 litre) of phlegm every day to capture and clear substances in the air and bacteria from the nose and throat.

== Distinction between mucus and phlegm ==
Contrary to popular misconception and misuse, mucus and phlegm are not always the same.

=== Mucus ===
Mucus is a normal protective layering around the airway, eye, nasal turbinate, and urogenital tract. Mucus is an adhesive viscoelastic gel produced in the airway by submucosal glands and goblet cells and is principally water. It also contains high-molecular weight mucous glycoproteins that form linear polymers.

=== Phlegm ===
Phlegm is more related to disease than mucus, and can be troublesome for the individual to excrete from the body. Phlegm is a thick secretion in the airway during disease and inflammation. Phlegm usually contains mucus with virus, bacteria, other debris, and sloughed-off inflammatory cells. Once phlegm has been expectorated by a cough, it becomes sputum.

== Excessive phlegm creation ==
There are multiple factors that can contribute to an excess of phlegm in the throat or larynx.

- Vocal abuse: Vocal abuse is the misuse or overuse of the voice in an unhealthy fashion such as clearing the throat, yelling, screaming, talking loudly, or singing incorrectly.
  - Clearing the throat: Clearing the throat removes or loosens phlegm but the vocal cords hit together causing inflammation and therefore more phlegm.
  - Yelling/screaming: Yelling and screaming both cause the vocal cords to hit against each other causing inflammation and phlegm.
  - Nodules: Excessive yelling, screaming, and incorrect singing as well as other vocal abusive habits can cause vocal fold nodules.
- Smoking: Smoke is hot, dry, polluted air which dries out the vocal cords. With each breath in of smoke, the larynx is polluted with toxins that inhibit it from rehydrating for about 3 hours. The vocal cords need a fair amount of lubrication and swell from inflammation when they do not have enough of it. When the vocal folds swell and are inflamed, phlegm is often created to attempt to ease the dryness.
- Illness: During illness like the flu, cold, and pneumonia, phlegm becomes more excessive as an attempt to get rid of the bacteria or viral particles within the body. A major illness associated with excess phlegm is acute bronchitis. A major symptom of acute bronchitis is an excess amount of phlegm and is usually caused by a viral infection, and only bacterial infections, which are rare, are to be treated with an antibiotic.
- Hay fever, asthma: In hay fever and asthma, the inner lining in the bronchioles becomes inflamed and creates an excess amount of phlegm that can clog up air pathways.
- Air pollution: In studies of children, air pollutants have been found to increase phlegm by drying out and irritating parts of the throat.

== Removing phlegm ==
Phlegm naturally drains down into the back of the throat and can be swallowed without imposing health risks. Once in the stomach, the acids and digestive system will remove the phlegm and get rid of the germs in it. In some cultures, swallowing phlegm is considered a social taboo, being described as disgusting or unhygienic. One Igbo adage, for example, uses the swallowing of phlegm as a metaphor for wrongdoing. Also, due to the social image of spitting (the alternative of swallowing) in some communities, females were shown to be more likely to swallow phlegm and less likely to report experiencing it.

The alternative to swallowing would be throat-clearing. To do this, the mouth should be closed and air should be inhaled hard into the nose. Inhaling forcefully through the nose will pull excess phlegm and nasal mucus down into the throat, where muscles in the throat and tongue can prepare to eject it. Once this is done, a U-shape should be formed with the tongue, while simultaneously forcing air and saliva forward with the muscles at the back of the throat. At this point, the phlegm will be in the mouth and is now ready to be spat out as sputum.

== Colors of phlegm ==
Phlegm can exist in different colors. The color could provide important clues about a person's health.

- Yellow or green: Indicates an infection often by a virus or bacteria. The color is caused by an enzyme produced by the white blood cells combating the infection.
- Clear: Indicates allergies. Mucous membranes produce histamines and make more phlegm.
- Red: Indicates dry air. A nasal spray can be used to alleviate symptoms of a dry nose and throat. It can also occur due to blood (such as if the person had or has a bleeding nose, or a lung malignancy).

== Illnesses related to phlegm ==
Phlegm may be a carrier of larvae of intestinal parasites (see hookworm). Bloody sputum can be a symptom of serious disease (such as tuberculosis), but can also be a relatively benign symptom of a minor disease (such as bronchitis). In the latter case, the sputum is normally lightly streaked with blood. Coughing up any significant quantity of blood is always a serious medical condition, and any person who experiences this should seek medical attention.

Apophlegmatisms, in pre-modern medicine, were medications chewed in order to draw away phlegm and humours.

== History ==
=== Phlegm and humourism ===
Humourism is an ancient theory that the human body is filled with four basic substances, called the four humours, which are held in balance when a person is healthy. It is closely related to the ancient theory of the four elements and states that all diseases and disabilities result from an excess or deficit in black bile, yellow bile, phlegm, and blood. Hippocrates, an ancient Greek medical doctor, is credited for this theory, about 400 BC. It influenced medical thinking for more than 2,000 years, until finally discredited in the 1800s.

Phlegm was thought to be associated with apathetic behaviour; this old belief is preserved in the word "phlegmatic".

To have "phlegm" traditionally meant to have stamina and to be unswayed by emotion. In his 1889 farewell speech at the University of Pennsylvania, Sir William Osler discussed the imperturbability required of physicians. "Imperturbability means coolness and presence of mind under all circumstances, calmness amid storm, clearness of judgment in moments of grave peril, immobility, impassiveness, or, to use an old and expressive word, phlegm."

The phlegm of Humourism is far from the same thing as phlegm as it is defined today. Nobel laureate Charles Richet, when describing humorism's "phlegm or pituitary secretion" in 1910 asked rhetorically, "this strange liquid, which is the cause of tumours, of chlorosis, of rheumatism, and cacochymia – where is it? Who will ever see it? Who has ever seen it? What can we say of this fanciful classification of humours into four groups, of which two are absolutely imaginary?"
