= Humorism =

Ancient Greek and Roman system of medicine involving four fluid types

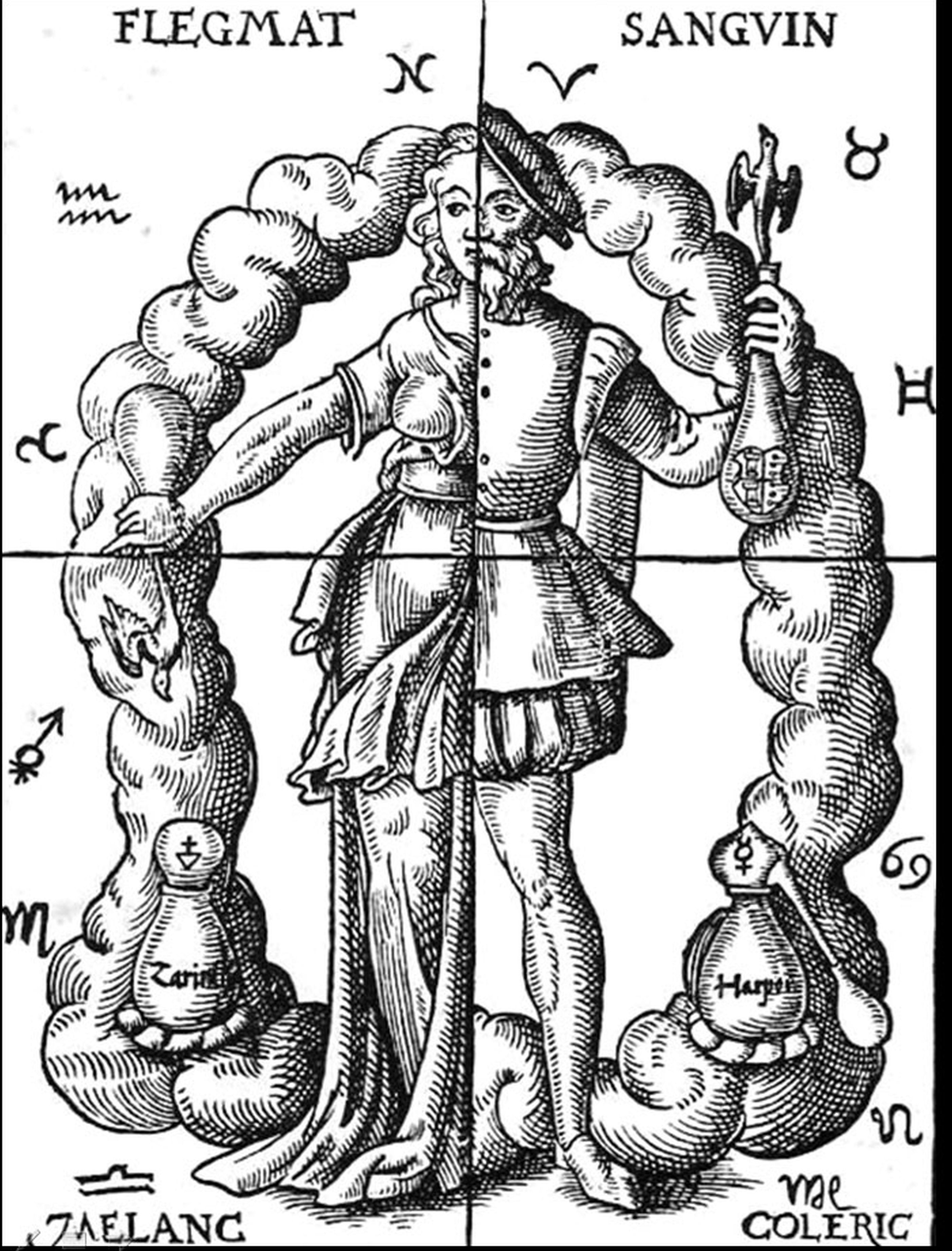
16th-century German illustration of the four humors: Flegmat (phlegm), Sanguin (blood), Coleric (yellow bile) and Melanc (black bile), divided between the male and female sexes

Humorism, the humoral theory, or humoralism, was a system of medicine detailing a supposed makeup and workings of the human body, adopted by Ancient Greek and Roman physicians and philosophers.

Humorism began to fall out of favor in the 17th century and it was definitively disproved with the discovery of microbes.

== Origin ==
The concept of "humors" may have origins in Ancient Egyptian medicine, or Mesopotamia, though it was not systemized until ancient Greek thinkers. The word humor is a translation of Greek χυμός, chymos (literally 'juice' or 'sap', metaphorically 'flavor'). Early texts on Indian Ayurveda medicine presented a theory of three or four humors (doṣas), which they sometimes linked with the five elements (pañca-bhūta): earth, water, fire, air, and space.

The concept of "humors" (chemical systems regulating human behaviour) became more prominent from the writing of medical theorist Alcmaeon of Croton (c. 540–500 BC). His list of humors was longer and included fundamental elements described by Empedocles, such as water, earth, fire, air, etc. Hippocrates is usually credited with applying this idea to medicine. In contrast to Alcmaeon, Hippocrates suggested that humors are the vital bodily fluids: blood, phlegm, yellow bile, and black bile. Alcmaeon and Hippocrates posited that an extreme excess or deficiency of any of the humors (bodily fluid) in a person can be a sign of illness. Hippocrates, and then Galen, suggested that a moderate imbalance in the mixture of these fluids produces behavioral patterns. One of the treatises attributed to Hippocrates, On the Nature of Man, describes the theory as follows:

The Human body contains blood, phlegm, yellow bile, and black bile. These are the things that make up its constitution and cause its pains and health. Health is primarily that state in which these constituent substances are in the correct proportion to each other, both in strength and quantity, and are well mixed. Pain occurs when one of the substances presents either a deficiency or an excess, or is separated in the body and not mixed with others. The body depends heavily on the four humors because their balanced combination helps to keep people in good health. Having the right amount of humor is essential for health. The pathophysiology of disease is consequently brought on by humor excesses and/or deficiencies.

The Hippocratic On the Nature of Man, and more particularly Galen's commentary on this text, forms the starting-point for the tradition on humoral theory. One of the reasons why this humoral theory became such a success (there were others around in antiquity) seems to be because of the authority of Galen.

The existence of fundamental biochemical substances and structural components in the body remains a compellingly shared point with Hippocratic beliefs, despite the fact that current science has moved away from those four Hippocratic humors.

Although the theory of the four humors does appear in some Hippocratic texts, other Hippocratic writers accepted the existence of only two humors, while some refrained from discussing the humoral theory at all. Humoralism, or the doctrine of the four temperaments, as a medical theory retained its popularity for centuries, largely through the influence of the writings of Galen (129–201 AD). The four essential elements—humors—that make up the human body, according to Hippocrates, are in harmony with one another and act as a catalyst for preserving health. Hippocrates' theory of four humors was linked with the popular theory of the four elements (earth, fire, water, and air) proposed by Empedocles, but this link was not proposed by Hippocrates or Galen, who referred primarily to bodily fluids. While Galen thought that humors were formed in the body, rather than ingested, he believed that different foods had varying potential to act upon the body to produce different humors. Warm foods, for example, tended to produce yellow bile, while cold foods tended to produce phlegm. Seasons of the year, periods of life, geographic regions, and occupations also influenced the nature of the humors formed. As such, certain seasons and geographic areas were understood to cause imbalances in the humors, leading to varying types of disease across time and place. For example, cities exposed to hot winds were seen as having higher rates of digestive problems as a result of excess phlegm running down from the head, while cities exposed to cold winds were associated with diseases of the lungs, acute diseases, and constipation, as well as ophthalmies (issues of the eyes), and nosebleeds. Cities to the west, meanwhile, were believed to produce weak, unhealthy, pale people that were subject to all manners of disease. In the treatise, On Airs, Waters, and Places, a Hippocratic physician is described arriving to an unnamed city where they test various factors of nature including the wind, water, and soil to predict the direct influence on the diseases specific to the city based on the season and the individual.

A fundamental idea of Hippocratic medicine was the endeavor to pinpoint the origins of illnesses in both the physiology of the human body and the influence of potentially hazardous environmental variables like air, water, and nutrition, and every humor has a distinct composition and is secreted by a different organ. Aristotle's concept of eucrasia—a state resembling equilibrium—and its relationship to the right balance of the four humors allow for the maintenance of human health, offering a more mathematical approach to medicine.

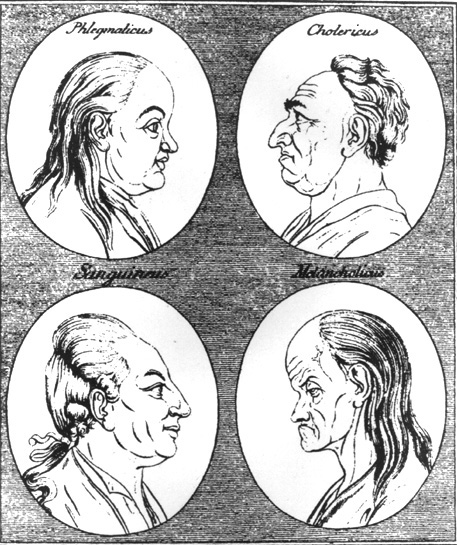
The four humors as depicted in an 18th-century woodcut: phlegmatic, choleric, sanguine and melancholic

The imbalance of humors, or dyscrasia, was thought to be the direct cause of all diseases. Health was associated with a balance of humors, or eucrasia. The qualities of the humors, in turn, influenced the nature of the diseases they caused. Yellow bile caused warm diseases and phlegm caused cold diseases. In On the Temperaments, Galen further emphasized the importance of the qualities. An ideal temperament involved a proportionally balanced mixture of the four qualities. Galen identified four temperaments in which one of the qualities (warm, cold, moist, or dry) predominated, and four more in which a combination of two (warm and moist, warm and dry, cold and dry, or cold and moist) dominated. These last four, named for the humors with which they were associated—sanguine, choleric, melancholic and phlegmatic—eventually became better known than the others. While the term temperament came to refer just to psychological dispositions, Galen used it to refer to bodily dispositions, which determined a person's susceptibility to particular diseases, as well as behavioral and emotional inclinations.

Disease could also be the result of the "corruption" of one or more of the humors, which could be caused by environmental circumstances, dietary changes, or many other factors. These deficits were thought to be caused by vapors inhaled or absorbed by the body. Greeks and Romans, and the later Muslim and Western European medical establishments that adopted and adapted classical medical philosophy, believed that each of these humors would wax and wane in the body, depending on diet and activity. When a patient was suffering from a surplus or imbalance of one of the four humors, then said patient's personality and/or physical health could be negatively affected.

Therefore, the goal of treatment was to rid the body of some of the excess humor through techniques like purging, bloodletting, catharsis, diuresis, and others. Bloodletting was already a prominent medical procedure by the first century, but venesection took on even more significance once Galen of Pergamum declared blood to be the most prevalent humor. The volume of blood extracted ranged from a few drops to several litres over the course of several days, depending on the patient's condition and the doctor's practice.

== Four humors ==
Even though humorism theory had several models that used two, three, and five components, the most famous model consists of the four humors described by Hippocrates and developed further by Galen. The four humors of Hippocratic medicine are black bile (Greek: μέλαινα χολή, melaina chole), yellow bile (Greek: ξανθὴ χολή, xanthe chole), phlegm (Greek: φλέγμα, phlegma), and blood (Greek: αἷμα, haima). Each corresponds to one of the traditional four temperaments. Based on Hippocratic medicine, it was believed that for a body to be healthy, the four humors should be balanced in amount and strength. The proper blending and balance of the four humors was known as eukrasia.

Humorism theory was expanded by Galen, who incorporated his understanding of the humors into his interpretation of the human body. He believed the interactions of the humors within the body were the key to investigating the physical nature and function of the organ systems. Galen combined his interpretation of the humors with his collection of ideas concerning nature from past philosophers in order to find conclusions about how the body works. For example, Galen maintained the idea of the presence of the Platonic tripartite soul, which consisted of "thumos (spiritedness), epithumos (directed spiritedness, i.e. desire), and sophia (wisdom)". Through this, Galen found a connection between these three parts of the soul and the three major organs that were recognized at the time: the heart, the liver, and the brain, respectively. This idea of connecting vital parts of the soul to vital parts of the body was derived from Aristotle's sense of explaining physical observations, and Galen utilized it to build his view of the human body. The organs (named organa) had specific functions (called chreiai) that contributed to the maintenance of the human body, and the expression of these functions is shown in characteristic activities (called energeiai) of a person. While the correspondence of parts of the body to the soul was an influential concept, Galen decided that the interaction of the four humors with natural bodily mechanisms were responsible for human development and this connection inspired his understanding of the nature of the components of the body.

Galen recalls the correspondence between humors and seasons in his On the Doctrines of Hippocrates and Plato, and says that, "As for ages and the seasons, the child (παῖς) corresponds to spring, the young man (νεανίσκος) to summer, the mature man (παρακµάζων) to autumn, and the old man (γέρων) to winter". He also related a correspondence between humors and seasons based on the properties of both. Blood, as a humor, was considered hot and wet. This gave it a correspondence to spring. Yellow bile was considered hot and dry, which related it to summer. Black bile was considered cold and dry, and thus related to autumn. Phlegm, cold and wet, was related to winter.

Galen also believed that the characteristics of the soul follow the mixtures of the body, but he did not apply this idea to the Hippocratic humors. He believed that phlegm did not influence character. In his On Hippocrates' The Nature of Man, Galen stated: "Sharpness and intelligence (ὀξὺ καὶ συνετόν) are caused by yellow bile in the soul, perseverance and consistency (ἑδραῖον καὶ βέβαιον) by the melancholic humor, and simplicity and naivety (ἁπλοῦν καὶ ἠλιθιώτερον) by blood. But the nature of phlegm has no effect on the character of the soul (τοῦ δὲ φλέγµατος ἡ φύσις εἰς µὲν ἠθοποιῗαν ἄχρηστος)." He further said that blood is a mixture of the four elements: water, air, fire, and earth.

These terms only partly correspond to modern medical terminology, in which there is no distinction between black and yellow bile, and phlegm has a very different meaning. It was believed that the humors were the basic substances from which all liquids in the body were made. Robin Fåhræus (1921), a Swedish physician who devised the erythrocyte sedimentation rate, suggested that the four humors were based upon the observation of blood clotting in a transparent container. When blood is drawn in a glass container and left undisturbed for about an hour, four different layers can be seen: a dark clot forms at the bottom (the "black bile"); above the clot is a layer of red blood cells (the "blood"); above this is a whitish layer of white blood cells (the "phlegm"); the top layer is clear yellow serum (the "yellow bile").

Many Greek texts were written during the golden age of the theory of the four humors in Greek medicine after Galen. One of those texts was an anonymous treatise called On the Constitution of the Universe and of Man, published in the mid-19th century by J. L. Ideler. In this text, the author establishes the relationship between elements of the universe (air, water, earth, fire) and elements of the man (blood, yellow bile, black bile, phlegm). He said that:

- The people who have red blood are friendly, and often joke and laugh. They are rose-tinted, slightly red, and have pretty skin.
- The people who have yellow bile are bitter, short tempered, and daring. They appear greenish and have yellow skin.
- The people who are composed of black bile are lazy, fearful, and sickly. They have black hair and black eyes.
- Those who have phlegm are low spirited, forgetful, and have white hair.

Seventeenth century English playwright Ben Jonson wrote humor plays, where character types were based on their humoral complexion.

=== Blood ===
It was thought that the nutritional value of the blood was the source of energy for the body and the soul. Blood was believed to consist of small proportional amounts of the other three humors. This meant that taking a blood sample would allow for determination of the balance of the four humors in the body. It was associated with a sanguine nature (enthusiastic, active, and social). Blood is considered to be hot and wet, sharing these characteristics with the season of spring.

=== Yellow bile ===
Yellow bile was associated with a choleric nature (ambitious, decisive, aggressive, and short-tempered). It was thought to be fluid found within the gallbladder, or in excretions such as vomit and feces. The associated qualities for yellow bile are hot and dry with the natural association of summer and fire. It was believed that an excess of this humor in an individual would result in emotional irregularities such as increased anger or irrational behaviour.

=== Black bile ===
Black bile was associated with a melancholy nature, the word melancholy itself deriving from the Greek for 'black bile', μέλαινα χολή (melaina kholé). Depression was attributed to excess or unnatural black bile secreted by the spleen. Cancer was also attributed to an excess of black bile concentrated in a specific area. The seasonal association of black bile was to autumn as the cold and dry characteristics of the season reflect the nature of man. Black bile was generally seen as the most detrimental of the humors and within Galenic-Hippocratic humoral theory it was opposed to blood, the most natural and beneficial of the humors.

=== Phlegm ===
Phlegm was associated with all phlegmatic nature, thought to be associated with reserved behavior. The phlegm of humorism is far from phlegm as it is defined today. Phlegm was used as a general term to describe white or colorless secretions such as pus, mucus, saliva, or sweat. Phlegm was also associated with the brain, possibly due to the color and consistency of brain tissue. The French physiologist and Nobel laureate Charles Richet, when describing humorism's "phlegm or pituitary secretion" in 1910, asked rhetorically, "this strange liquid, which is the cause of tumours, of chlorosis, of rheumatism, and cacochymia – where is it? Who will ever see it? Who has ever seen it? What can we say of this fanciful classification of humors into four groups, of which two are absolutely imaginary?" The seasonal association of phlegm is winter due to the natural properties of being cold and wet.

== Humor production ==
Humors were believed to be produced via digestion as the final products of hepatic digestion. Digestion is a continuous process taking place in every animal, and it can be divided into four sequential stages: the gastric digestion stage, the hepatic digestion stage, the vascular digestion stage, and the tissue digestion stage. Each stage digests food until it becomes suitable for use by the body. In gastric digestion, food is made into chylous, which is suitable for the liver to absorb and carry on digestion. Chylous is changed into chymous in the hepatic digestion stage. Chymous is composed of the four humors: blood, phlegm, yellow bile, and black bile. These four humors then circulate in the blood vessels. In the last stage of digestion, tissue digestion, food becomes similar to the organ tissue for which it is destined.

If anything goes wrong leading up to the production of humors, there will be an imbalance leading to disease. Proper organ functioning is necessary in the production of good humor. The stomach and liver also have to function normally for proper digestion. If there are any abnormalities in gastric digestion, the liver, blood vessels, and tissues cannot be provided with the raw chylous, which can cause abnormal humor and blood composition. A healthy functioning liver is not capable of converting abnormal chylous into normal chylous and normal humors.

Humors are the end product of gastric digestion, but they are not the end product of the digestion cycle, so an abnormal humor produced by hepatic digestion will affect other digestive organs.

== Relation to jaundice ==
According to Hippocratic humoral theory, jaundice is present in the Hippocratic Corpus. Some of the first descriptions of jaundice come from the Hippocratic physicians (icterus). The ailment appears multiple times in the Hippocratic Corpus, where its genesis, description, prognosis, and therapy are given. The five kinds of jaundice mentioned in the Hippocratic Corpus all share a yellow or greenish skin color.

A modern doctor will undoubtedly start to think of the symptoms listed in contemporary atlases of medicine after reading the clinical symptoms of each variety of jaundice listed in the Hippocratic Corpus. Despite the fact that the Hippocratic physicians' therapeutic approaches have little to do with contemporary medical practice, their capacity for observation as they described the various forms of jaundice is remarkable. In the Hippocratic Corpus, the Hippocratic physicians make multiple references to jaundice. At that time, jaundice was viewed as an illness unto itself rather than a symptom brought on by a disease.

== Unification with Empedocles's model ==
Empedocles's theory suggested that there are four elements: earth, fire, water, and air, with the earth producing the natural systems. Since this theory was influential for centuries, later scholars paired qualities associated with each humor as described by Hippocrates/Galen with seasons and "basic elements" as described by Empedocles.

The following table shows the four humors with their corresponding elements, seasons, sites of formation, and resulting temperaments:

Humor	Season	Age	Element	Organ	Temperaments	
Blood	Spring	Infancy	Air	Liver	Warm and moist	Sanguine
Yellow bile	Summer	Youth	Fire	Gallbladder	Warm and dry	Choleric
Black bile	Autumn	Adulthood	Earth	Spleen	Cold and dry	Melancholic
Phlegm	Winter	Old age	Water	Brain/lungs	Cold and moist	Phlegmatic

== Influence and legacy ==
=== Islamic medicine ===
Medieval medical tradition in the Golden Age of Islam adopted the theory of humorism from Greco-Roman medicine, notably via the Persian polymath Avicenna's The Canon of Medicine (1025). Avicenna summarized the four humors and temperaments as follows:

Avicenna's (ibn Sina) four humors and temperaments
Evidence	Hot	Cold	Moist	Dry
Morbid states	Inflammations become febrile	Fevers related to serious humor, rheumatism	Lassitude	Loss of vigour
Functional power	Deficient energy	Deficient digestive power	Difficult digestion	
Subjective sensations	Bitter taste, excessive thirst, burning at cardia	Lack of desire for fluids	Mucoid salivation, sleepiness	Insomnia, wakefulness
Physical signs	High pulse rate, lassitude	Flaccid joints	Diarrhea, swollen eyelids, rough skin, acquired habit	Rough skin, acquired habit
Foods and medicines	Calefacients harmful, infrigidants beneficial	Infrigidants harmful, calefacients beneficial	Moist articles harmful	Dry regimen harmful, humectants beneficial
Relation to weather	Worse in summer	Worse in winter		Bad in autumn

=== Perso-Arabic and Indian medicine ===
The Unani school of medicine, practiced in Perso-Arabic countries, India, and Pakistan, is based on Galenic and Avicennian medicine in its emphasis on the four humors as a fundamental part of the methodologic paradigm.

=== Western medicine ===
The humoralist system of medicine was highly individualistic, for all patients were said to have their own unique humoral composition. From Hippocrates onward, the humoral theory was adopted by Greek, Roman and Islamic physicians, and dominated the view of the human body among European physicians until around the 17th century, with Andreas Vesalius's 1543 De Humani Corporis Fabrica questioning Galen in general and especially William Harvey's 1628 De Motu Cordis directly challenging the theories of blood.

The four humors and their qualities

Typical 18th-century practices such as bleeding a sick person or applying hot cups to a person were based on the humoral theory of imbalances of fluids (blood and bile in those cases). Methods of treatment like bloodletting, emetics and purges were aimed at expelling a surplus of a humor. Apocroustics were medications intended to stop the flux of malignant humors to a diseased body part.

16th-century Swiss physician Paracelsus further developed the idea that beneficial medical substances could be found in herbs, minerals and various alchemical combinations thereof. These beliefs were the foundation of mainstream Western medicine well into the 17th century. Specific minerals or herbs were used to treat ailments simple to complex, from an uncomplicated upper respiratory infection to the plague. For example, chamomile was used to decrease heat, and lower excessive bile humor. Arsenic was used in a poultice bag to 'draw out' the excess humor(s) that led to symptoms of the plague. Apophlegmatisms, in pre-modern medicine, were medications chewed to draw away excess phlegm.

Although advances in cellular pathology and chemistry criticized humoralism by the 17th century, the theory had dominated Western medical thinking for more than 2,000 years. Only in some instances did the theory of humoralism wane into obscurity. One such instance occurred in the sixth and seventh centuries in the Byzantine Empire when traditional secular Greek culture gave way to Christian influences. Though the use of humoralist medicine continued during this time, its influence was diminished in favor of religion. The revival of Greek humoralism, owing in part to changing social and economic factors, did not begin until the early ninth century. Use of the practice in modern times is pseudoscience.

=== Modern use ===
Humoral theory was the grand unified theory of medicine, before the invention of modern medicine, for more than 2,000 years. The theory was one of the fundamental tenets of the teachings of the Greek physician-philosopher Hippocrates (460–370 BC), who is regarded as the first practitioner of medicine, appropriately referred to as the "Father of Modern Medicine".

With the advent of the doctrine of specific etiology, the humoral theory's demise hastened even further. This demonstrates that there is only one precise cause and one specific issue for each and every sickness or disorder that has been diagnosed.

Modern medicine refers to humoral immunity or humoral regulation when describing substances such as hormones and antibodies, but this is not a remnant of the humor theory. It is merely a literal use of humoral, i.e. pertaining to bodily fluids (such as blood and lymph).

The concept of humorism was not definitively disproven until 1858. There were no studies performed to prove or disprove the impact of dysfunction in known bodily organs producing named fluids (humors) on temperament traits simply because the list of temperament traits was not defined up until the end of the 20th century.

=== Culture ===
Theophrastus and others developed a set of characters based on the humors. Those with too much blood were sanguine. Those with too much phlegm were phlegmatic. Those with too much yellow bile were choleric, and those with too much black bile were melancholic. The idea of human personality based on humors contributed to the character comedies of Menander and, later, Plautus. Through the neo-classical revival in Europe, the humor theory dominated medical practice, and the theory of humoral types made periodic appearances in drama. The humors were an important and popular iconographic theme in European art, found in paintings, tapestries, and sets of prints.

The humors can be found in Elizabethan works, such as in The Taming of the Shrew, in which the character Petruchio, a choleric man, uses humoral therapy techniques on Katherina, a choleric woman, in order to tame her into the socially acceptable phlegmatic woman. Some examples include: he yells at the servants for serving mutton, a choleric food, to two people who are already choleric; he deprives Katherina of sleep; and he, Katherina and their servant Grumio endure a cold walk home, for cold temperatures were said to tame choleric temperaments.

The theory of the four humors features prominently in Rupert Thomson's 2005 novel Divided Kingdom.

== See also ==
- Classical element
- Comedy of humours
- Dosha
- Four temperaments
- Mitama
- Wuxing (Chinese philosophy)

== Bibliography ==
- Conrad, Lawrence I. The Western Medical Tradition 800 BC to AD 1800. Cambridge: Cambridge University Press, 2011.
- Edwards. "A treatise concerning the plague and the pox discovering as well the meanes how to preserve from the danger of these infectious contagions, as also how to cure those which are infected with either of them". 1652.
- Emtiazy, M., Keshavarz, M., Khodadoost, M., Kamalinejad, M., Gooshahgir, S. A., Shahrad Bajestani, H., ... Alizad, M. (2012). Relation between Body Humors and Hypercholesterolemia: An Iranian Traditional Medicine Perspective Based on the Teaching of Avicenna. Iranian Red Crescent Medical Journal, 14(3), 133–138.
- Karenberg, A. (2015). "Blood, Phlegm and Spirits: Galen on Stroke". History of Medicine: The Russian Journal. 2 (2). doi:10.17720/2409-5834.v2.2.2015.15k (inactive 9 November 2026).
- Moore, Philip. "The hope of health wherin is conteined a goodlie regimente of life: as medicine, good diet and the goodlie vertues of sonderie herbes, doen by Philip Moore." 1564.
- Burton, Robert. 1621. The Anatomy of Melancholy, Book I, New York 2001, p. 147: "The radical or innate is daily supplied by nourishment, which some call cambium, and make those secondary humors of ros and gluten to maintain it [...]".
- Jouanna, Jacques; Allies, Neil (2012). "The Legacy of the Hippocratic Treatise the Nature of Man". In van der Eijk, Philip (ed.). Greek Medicine from Hippocrates to Galen. Studies in Ancient Medicine. Vol. 40. Brill. pp. 335–360. JSTOR 10.1163/j.ctt1w76vxr.21.
- Williams, William F. Encyclopedia of Pseudoscience: From Alien Abductions to Zone Therapy. Hoboken: Taylor and Francis, 2013.
