= Epidural space =

Space between the dura mater and vertebrae

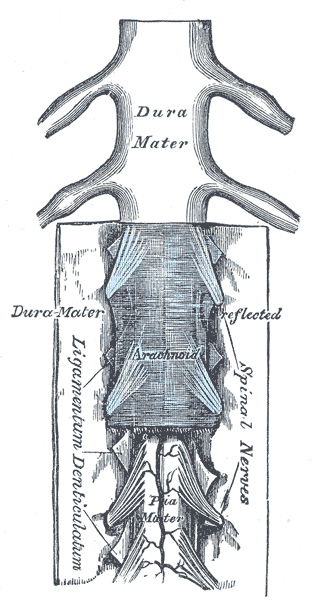
- The medulla spinalis and its membranes

Details

Identifiers
- Latin: spatium epidurale, spatium extradurale, cavum epidurale
- MeSH: D004824
- TA98: A14.1.01.112; A14.1.01.110
- TA2: 5381, 5383
- FMA: 71228

In anatomy, the epidural space is the potential space between the dura mater and vertebrae (spine).

The anatomy term "epidural space" has its origin in the Ancient Greek language; ἐπί, "on, upon" + dura mater also known as "epidural cavity", "extradural space" or "peridural space". In humans the epidural space contains lymphatics, spinal nerve roots, loose connective tissue, adipose tissue, small arteries, dural venous sinuses and a network of internal vertebral venous plexuses.

== Cranial epidural space ==
In the skull, the periosteal layer of the dura mater adheres to the inner surface of the skull bones while the meningeal layer lays over the arachnoid mater. Between them is the epidural space. The two layers of the dura mater separate at several places, with the meningeal layer projecting deeper into the brain parenchyma forming fibrous septa that compartmentalize the brain tissue. At these sites, the epidural space is wide enough to house the epidural venous sinuses.

There are four fibrous septa:

1. Falx cerebri, that separates the left and right hemispheres of the cerebrum. It contains the superior sagittal sinus and inferior sagittal sinus.
2. Tentorium cerebelli, which separates the cerebrum from cerebellum and contains the transverse sinus, straight sinus and superior petrosal sinus.
3. Diaphragma sellae, that encloses the hypophyseal fossa from the superior side, cushioning the pituitary gland. It contains the anterior and posterior intercavernous sinuses.
4. Falx cerebelli, which separates the left and right cerebellar hemispheres and contains the occipital sinus.

In pathological conditions fluid such as blood can fill this space. For example a torn meningeal artery (often the middle meningeal artery) or dural venous sinus (rarely) may bleed into this potential space and result in an epidural hematoma.

== Spinal epidural space ==
In the spinal canal, the periosteal layer adheres to the inner surface of the spinal canal which is formed by the bodies of vertebrae. The meningeal layer lays over the spinal arachnoid mater. Between the vertebrae and the dural sheath is the spinal epidural space. Unlike the cranial epidural space, the spinal epidural space contains adipose tissue, the internal vertebral venous plexuses and the spinal nerve roots. The spinal epidural space spans the length of the spinal cord, from the foramen magnum superiorly to the sacral hiatus inferiorly.

Epidural space is the smallest at the cervical region, measuring 1 to 2 mm. At L2 to L3, enlarges until 5 to 6 mm. It then enlarges progressively until lower lumbar and sacral region. However, some authors stated that it decreases in size after mid-lumbar region until 2 mm at S1 level.

== See also ==
- Subarachnoid space
- Subdural space
- Meninges
