= Sinus (anatomy) =

Sac or cavity in any organ or tissue

A sinus is a sac or cavity in any organ or tissue, or an abnormal cavity or passage. In common usage, "sinus" usually refers to the paranasal sinuses, which are air cavities in the cranial bones, especially those near the nose and connecting to it. Most individuals have four paired cavities located in the cranial bone or skull.

== Etymology ==
Sinus is Latin for "bay", "pocket", "curve", or "bosom". In anatomy, the term is used in various contexts.

The word "sinusitis" is used to indicate that one or more of the membrane linings found in the sinus cavities has become inflamed or infected. It is however distinct from a fistula, which is a tract connecting two epithelial surfaces. If left untreated, infections occurring in the sinus cavities can affect the chest and lungs.

== Sinuses in the body ==
- Paranasal sinuses
  - Maxillary
  - Ethmoid
  - Sphenoid
  - Frontal
- Dural venous sinuses
  - Anterior midline
    - Cavernous
    - Superior petrosal
    - Inferior petrosal
  - Central sulcus
    - Inferior sagittal
    - Superior sagittal
      - Straight
  - Confluence of sinuses
  - Lateral
    - Transverse
    - Sigmoid
  - Inferior
    - Occipital
- Arterial sinuses
  - Carotid sinus
- Organ-specific spaces
  - Costodiaphragmatic recess (lung/diaphragm sinus, also known as phrenicocostal sinus)
  - Renal sinus (drains renal medulla)
  - Coronary sinus (subdivisions of the pericardium)
  - Lymphatic spaces
    - Subcapsular sinus (space between the lymph node and capsule)
    - Trabecular sinuses (space around the invaginations of the lymphatic capsule)
    - Medullary sinuses (space between the lymphatic cortex and efferent lymphatic drainage)

== Paranasal sinuses ==
The four paired sinuses or air cavities can be referred to as:

- Ethmoid sinus cavities which are located between the eyes.
- Frontal sinus cavities which can be found above the eyes (more in the forehead region).
- Maxillary sinus cavities are located on either side of the nostrils (cheekbone areas).
- Sphenoid sinuses that are located behind the eyes and lie in the deeper recesses of the skull.

=== Function ===
The function of the sinus cavities within the cranial bone (skull) is not entirely clear. Beliefs about their possible function include:

- Sinus cavities allow for voice resonance
- They help filter and add moisture to any air that is inhaled through the nasal passages and in the removal of unwanted particles from the sinus cavities.
- Sinus cavities lighten the skull.
- Sinus cavities allow space to accommodate for growth
- Sinus cavities may serve as shock absorption upon trauma

=== Sinusitis ===
If one or more of the paired paranasal sinuses or air cavities becomes inflamed, it leads to an infection called sinusitis. The term "sinusitis" means an inflammation of one or more of the sinus cavities. This inflammation causes an increase in internal pressure within these areas. The pressure is often experienced in the cheek area, eyes, nose, on one side of the head (temple areas), and can result in a severe headache.

When diagnosing a sinus infection, one can identify which sinus cavity the infection is located in by the term given to the cavity. Ethmoiditis refers to an infection in the ethmoid sinus cavity/ies, frontal sinusitis refers to an infection occurring in the frontal sinus cavity/ies, antritis is used to refer to an infection in the maxillary sinus cavity/ies whilst sphenoiditis refers to an infection in the sphenoid sinus cavity/ies.

==== Classification ====
Sinusitis can be acute, chronic or recurrent.

- Acute: Any sinus infection which lasts for a maximum of three weeks can be referred to as acute sinusitis; with the affected individual displaying symptoms such as congestion, post nasal drip, halitosis, a runny nose as well as sinus pressure and pain in the affected areas.
- Chronic: This infection extends beyond the three-week period and if left untreated can persist for years. Causes of chronic sinusitis include allergies that have been left untreated, bacterial or fungal infections within one or more of the sinus cavities and any allergic disorders which target and increase the sensitivity of the mucous membrane linings which surround the sinus cavities and nasal passages. Symptoms of chronic sinusitis are debilitating headaches, green colored mucus, severe nasal blockages or congestion and heavy pressure experienced in the cheek, forehead, temple and eye regions.
- Recurrent: This type of sinus infection is intermittent; a person usually experiences this type of infection numerous times throughout a year with periods of complete relief being experienced for weeks or months between episodes of infection.

==== Causes ====
A sinus infection can have a number of causes. Untreated allergies are one of the main contributing factors to the development of sinus infections. A person with a sinus infection often has nasal congestion with thick nasal secretions, fever, and cough (WebMD). Patients can be treated by “reducing the swelling or inflammation in the nasal passages and sinuses, eliminating the infection, promoting drainage from the sinuses, and maintaining open sinuses” (WebMD). Sinusitis can be treated with medications and can also be eliminated by surgery.

Another cause of sinus infections is a result of bacterial invasion within one or more of the sinus cavities. Any bacteria that enter the nasal passages and sinus cavities through the air that is inhaled, are trapped by the mucus secreted by the mucous membranes surrounding these areas. These trapped particles can cause an irritation to these linings resulting in swelling and inflammation. “Bacteria that normally cause acute sinusitis are Streptococcus pneumoniae, Haemophilus influenzae, and Moraxella catarrhalis (WebMD). These microorganisms, along with Staphylococcus aureus and some anaerobes (bacteria that live without oxygen), are involved in chronic sinusitis. (WebMD)” Fungi can also cause chronic sinusitis.

Certain abnormalities or trauma related injuries to the nasal cavity can make it difficult for effective drainage of mucus from the sinus cavities. This mucus is then allowed to develop in these areas making the cavity an ideal area in which bacteria can both attach and thrive.

==== Treatment outlook ====
Sinusitis or sinus infections usually clear up if treated early and appropriately. Apart from complications, the outlook for acute bacterial sinusitis is good. People may develop chronic sinusitis or have recurrent attacks of acute sinusitis if they suffer with allergies or if they have any “structural or anatomical causes" which predispose them to developing sinus infections.

Viral sinus infections do not, however, respond well to conventional treatments such as antibiotics. When treating fungal sinusitis, an appropriate fungicide is usually administered.
