= List of terms using the word occipital =

Descriptor for several areas of animal and human anatomy

The adjective occipital, in zoology, means pertaining to the occiput (rear of the skull).

Occipital is a descriptor for several areas of animal and human anatomy.

- External occipital protuberance
- Internal occipital crest
- Greater occipital nerve
- Lesser occipital nerve
- Occipital artery
- Occipital bone
- Occipital bun
- Occipital condyle
- Occipital groove
- Occipital lobe
- Occipital plane
- Occipital pole
- Occipital ridge
- Occipital scales
- Occipital triangle
- Occipital vein
- Parieto-occipital sulcus
- PGO (Ponto-geniculo-occipital) waves
- Preoccipital notch
