= Marginal sinus =

Details
- Drains to: Sigmoid sinus, or jugular bulb

Identifiers
- Latin: sinus marginalis

The marginal sinus is a dural venous sinus surrounding the margin of the foramen magnum inside the skull, accommodated by the groove for marginal sinus. It usually drains into either the sigmoid sinus, or the jugular bulb. It communicates with the basilar venous plexus anteriorly, and the occipital sinus posteriorly (the posterior union of the left and the right marginal sinus usually representing the commencement of the occipital sinus); it may form extracranial communications with the internal vertebral venous plexuses, or deep cervical veins.

== Clinical significance ==
Arteriovenous fistulas involving the marginal sinus have been described - often following basilar skull fractures.

The marginal sinus must be traversed during surgical entry into subdural space deep to the foramen magnum.
