= Falx cerebri =

Anatomical structure of the brain

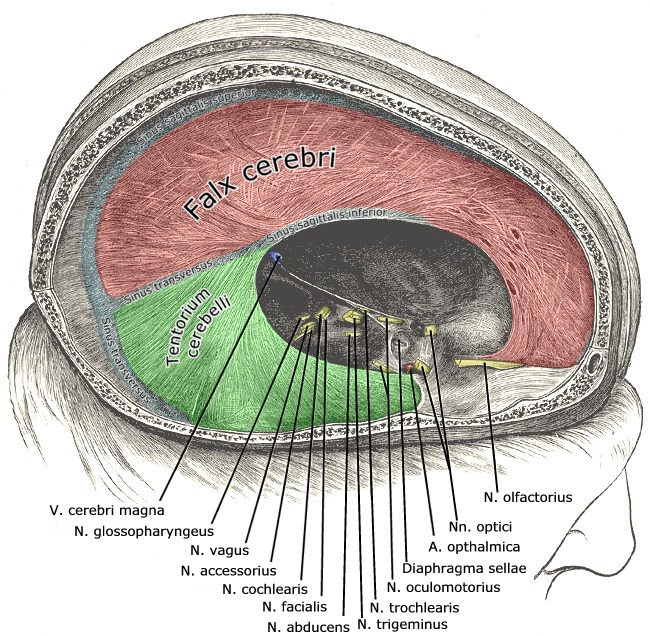
- Dura mater and its processes exposed by removing part of the right half of the skull and the brain.

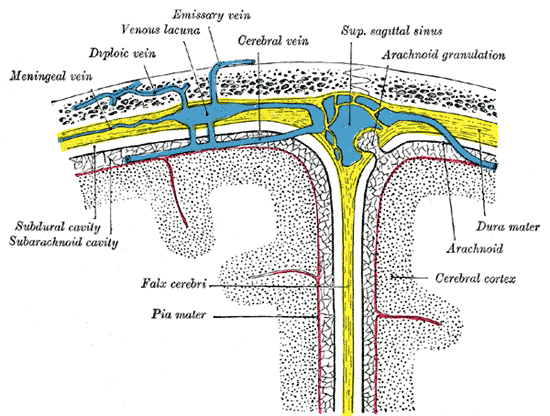
- Diagrammatic representation of a section across the top of the skull, showing the membranes of the brain, etc. (Falx cerebri is yellow line running down center.)

Details
- Part of: Meninges

Identifiers
- Latin: falx cerebri
- NeuroNames: 1237
- TA98: A14.1.01.103
- TA2: 5374
- FMA: 83967

The falx cerebri (also known as the cerebral falx) is a large, crescent-shaped fold of dura mater that descends vertically into the longitudinal fissure to separate the cerebral hemispheres. It supports the dural sinuses that provide venous and CSF drainage from the brain. It is attached to the crista galli anteriorly, and blends with the tentorium cerebelli posteriorly.

The falx cerebri is often subject to age-related calcification, and a site of falcine meningiomas.

The falx cerebri is named for its sickle-like shape.

== Anatomy ==
The falx cerebri is a strong, crescent-shaped sheet of dura mater lying in the sagittal plane between the two cerebral hemispheres. It is one of four dural partitions of the brain along with the falx cerebelli, tentorium cerebelli, and diaphragma sellae; it is formed through invagination of the dura mater into the longitudinal fissure between the cerebral hemispheres.

Anteriorly, the falx cerebri is narrower, thinner, and may have a number of perforations. It is broader posteriorly.

=== Attachments ===
The falx cerebri attaches anteriorly at the crista galli (proximally to the cribriform plate and to the frontal and ethmoid sinuses).

Posteriorly, it blends into the upper surface of the cerebellar tentorium.

Its convex superior margin is attached to the internal surface of the skull on either side of the midline. This attachment runs as far back as the internal occipital protuberance (the latter representing its posterior-most point of attachment); the superior sagittal sinus runs in the cranial groove between the falx cerebri's two attachments.

The (concave) inferior margin of the falx cerebri is free.

=== Vascular supply ===
The falx cerebri receives its blood supply primarily from two vessels; the anterior portion receives blood supply from the anterior meningeal artery (a.k.a. anterior falx artery, or anterior falcine artery) (a branch of the anterior ethmoidal artery), and the posterior portion from the posterior meningeal artery (a branch of the ascending pharyngeal artery).

Lymphatic drainage of the falx cerebri occurs mostly via meningeal lymphatic vessels that run parallel to the dural sinuses and that eventually exit the cranial vault through the jugular foramen to empty into deep cervical lymph nodes. A minority of lymph from the falx cerebri is drained anteriorly through the cribiform plate into the lymphatics of the nasal mucosa.

=== Innervation ===
The falx cerebri receives innervation from all three branches of the trigeminal nerve. It receives sympathetic innervation predominantly from the superior cervical ganglia. It may receive additional innervation from dorsal rami of CN 1 and CN 2, the hypoglossal nerve, and recurrent branches of the vagus nerve.

=== Anatomical relations ===
The falx cerebri is situated in the longitudinal fissure, in between the cerebral hemispheres. The corpus callosum lies immediately inferior to the lower (free) margin of falx cerebri.

==== Dural venous sinuses ====
The superior sagittal sinus is contained in the superior margin of the falx cerebri and overlies the longitudinal fissure of the brain.

The inferior sagittal sinus is contained in the inferior free margin of the falx cerebri and arches over the corpus callosum, deep within the longitudinal fissure.

The straight sinus courses along the juncture of the falx cerebri and cerebellar tentorium.

=== Anatomical variation ===
Total or partial agenesis of the falx cerebri may occur, and may result in adherence of the cerebral hemispheres across the midline. Agenesis is usually associated with other developmental complications; falx cerebri agenesis in absence of other neural symptoms is exceedingly rare.

== Microanatomy ==
The falx cerebri contains blood vessels, and nerves.

== Clinical significance ==
=== Calcification ===
Calcification of the falx cerebri is more prevalent in older patients, often without a determinable cause, and without pathogenic symptoms.

=== Meningioma ===
Falcine meningioma is a meningioma arising from the falx cerebri and completely concealed by the overlying cortex. Falcine meningioma tends to grow predominantly into one cerebral hemisphere but is often bilateral, and in some patients the tumor grows into the inferior edge of the sagittal sinus. However, although much information is available regarding meningiomas, little is known about falcine meningiomas.

=== Surgical landmark ===
The falx cerebri is a significant surgical landmark for access of the lateral ventricles via the interhemispheric transcallosal approach; agenesis (complete or partial) of the falx cerebri results in the adherence of the cerebral hemispheres, blocking midline transcallosal surgical access to the ventricles.

=== Subfalcine brain herniation ===
Subfalcine herniation of the cingulate gyrus may occur following traumatic brain injury.

== Additional images ==
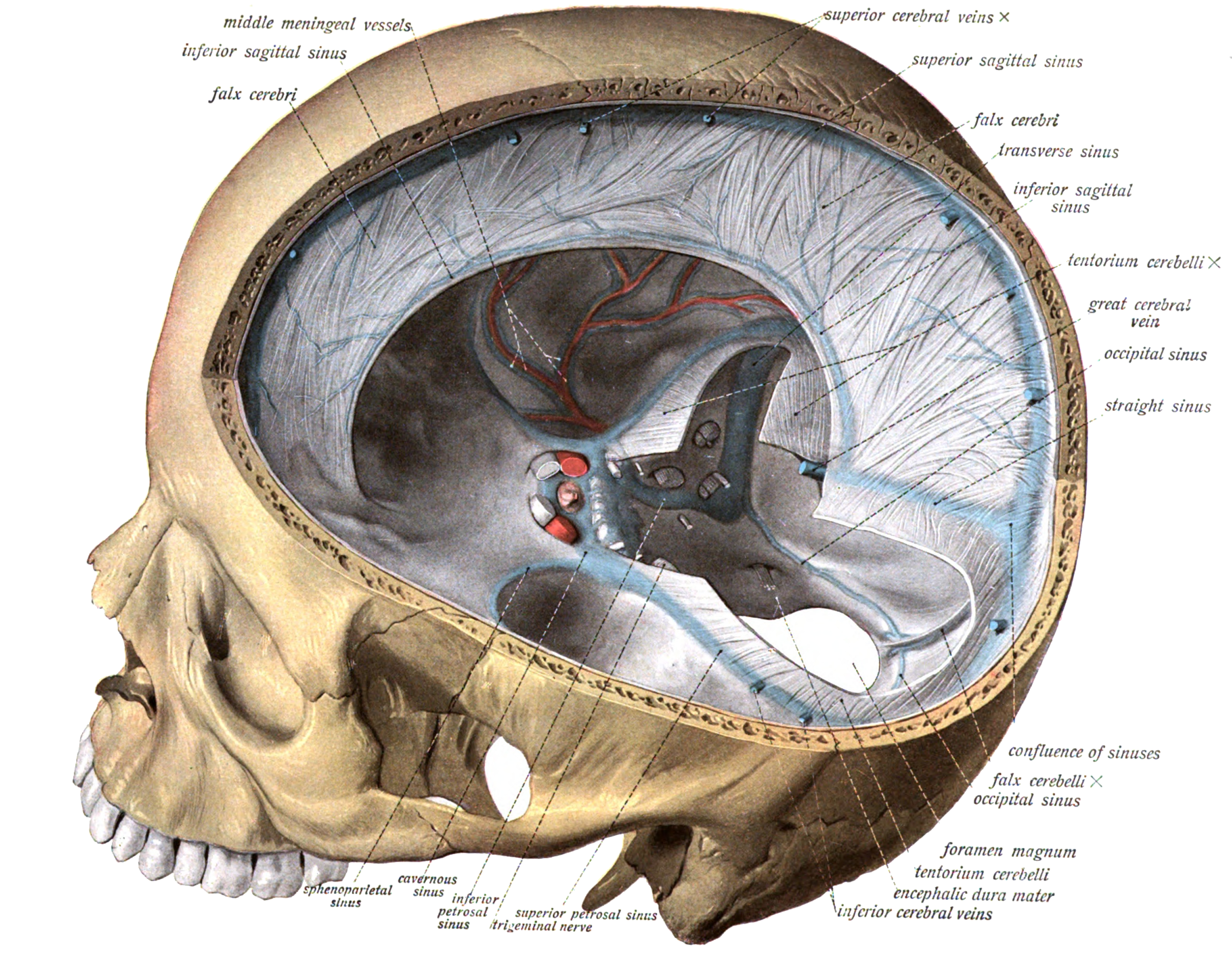
Falx cerebri in relation to the skull.

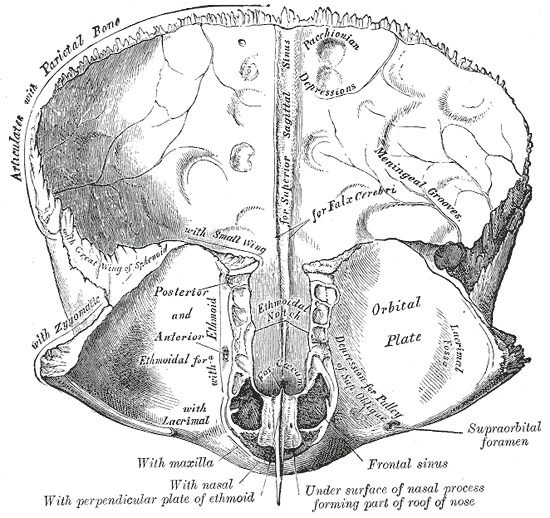
Frontal bone. Inner surface.

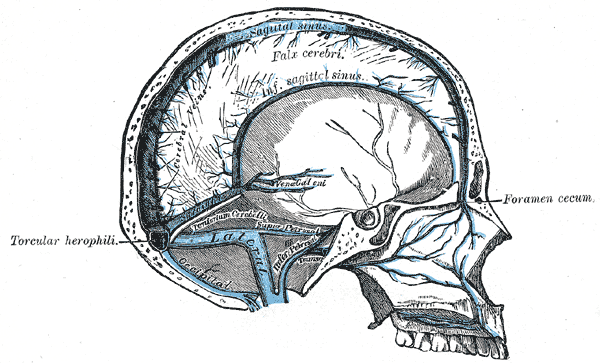
Sagittal section of the skull, showing the sinuses of the dura.

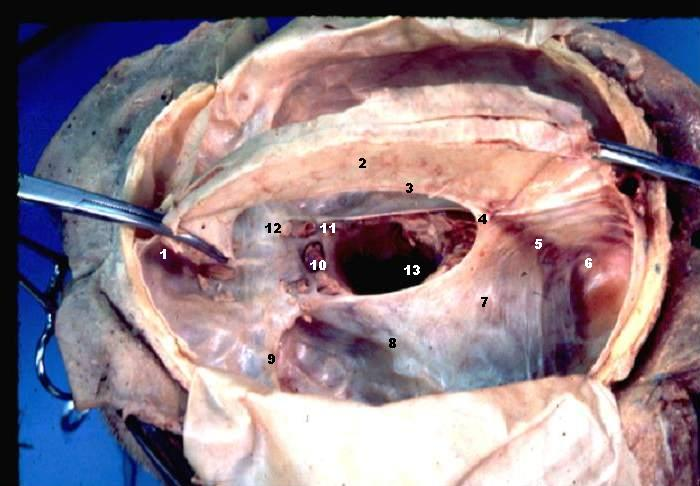
Human brain dura mater (reflections)

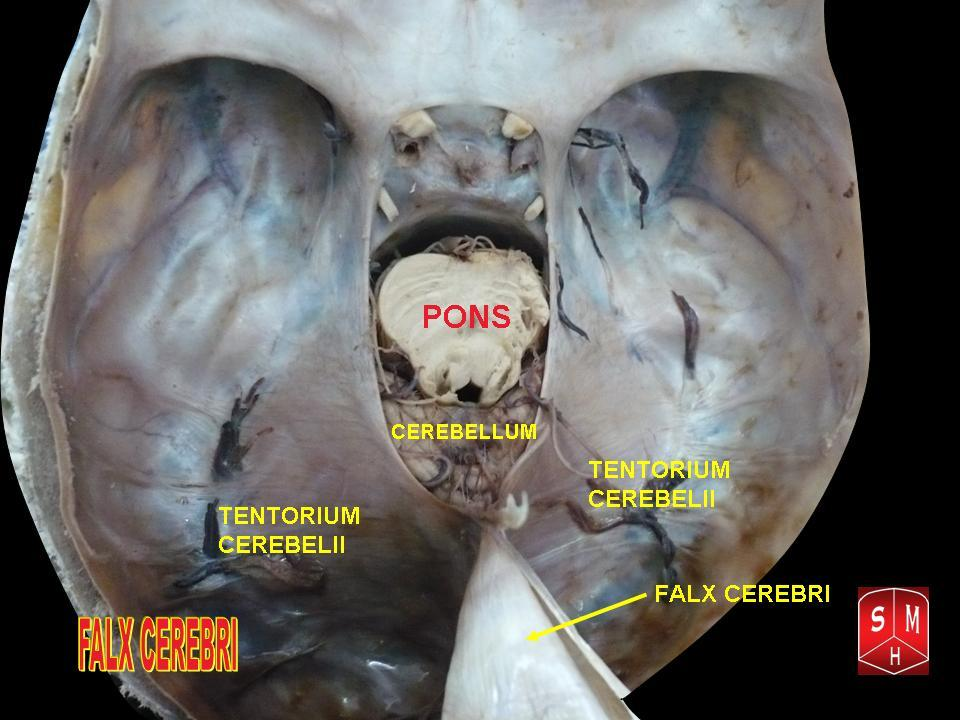
Falx cerebri

== See also ==
- Falx (disambiguation), other parts of the anatomy with names including "falx"
