= Meningeal branches of vertebral artery =

Details
- Source: Vertebral artery
- Supplies: Meninges

Identifiers
- Latin: rami meningei arteriae vertebralis
- TA98: A12.2.08.011
- TA2: 4541
- FMA: 71506

The meningeal branches of vertebral artery (posterior meningeal branch) springs from the vertebral opposite the foramen magnum, ramifies between the bone and dura mater in the cerebellar fossa, and supplies the falx cerebelli.

It is frequently represented by one or two small branches.
