= Condylar emissary vein =

Details

Identifiers
- Latin: vena emissaria condylaris
- TA98: A12.3.05.304
- TA2: 4875
- FMA: 50793

The condylar emissary vein is a vein connecting the suboccipital plexus of veins with the sigmoid sinus. It is clinically significant because it is a possible mode of transportation for disease into the cranium.
