= Sagittal sinus =

Sagittal sinus may refer to:

- Superior sagittal sinus
- Inferior sagittal sinus
