= Longitudinal fissure =

Deep groove separating the two cerebral hemispheres of the vertebrate brain

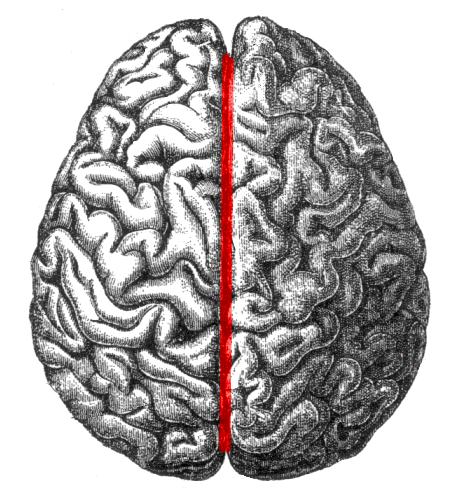
- The human brain as viewed from above. Median longitudinal fissure visible in red, running top to bottom.

- Longitudinal fissure shown in red (animation)

Details

Identifiers
- Latin: fissura longitudinalis cerebri, fissura cerebri longitudinalis
- NeuroNames: 35
- NeuroLex ID: birnlex_4041
- TA98: A14.1.09.007
- TA2: 5417
- FMA: 83727

The longitudinal fissure (or cerebral fissure, great longitudinal fissure, median longitudinal fissure, interhemispheric fissure) is the deep groove that separates the two cerebral hemispheres of the vertebrate brain. Lying within it is a continuation of the dura mater (one of the meninges) called the falx cerebri. The inner surfaces of the two hemispheres are convoluted by gyri and sulci just as is the outer surface of the brain.

== Structure ==
=== Falx cerebri ===
All three meninges of the cortex (dura mater, arachnoid mater, pia mater) fold and descend deep down into the longitudinal fissure, physically separating the two hemispheres. Falx cerebri is the name given to the dura mater in-between the two hemispheres, whose significance arises from the fact that it is the outermost layer of the meninges. These layers prevent any direct connectivity between the bilateral lobes of the cortex, thus requiring any tracts to pass through the corpus callosum. The vasculature of falx cerebri supplies blood to the innermost surfaces of the cortex, neighboring the midsagittal plane.

=== Cerebral asymmetry ===
Though this fissure divides the brain, the two hemispheres of the human cortex are not perfectly symmetrical, both in structure and in function. For example, the planum temporale, roughly corresponding to the Wernicke’s area, was found to be 10 times larger in the left than the right hemisphere. In contrast, the caudate nucleus, within the basal ganglia, was found to be larger in the right hemisphere.

=== Corpus callosum ===
The corpus callosum connects the two halves of the brain below the fissure and conveys visual, auditory, and somatosensory messages between each half. The corpus callosum is responsible for eye movement and visual perception, maintaining a balance between arousal and attention, and the ability to identify locations of sensory stimulation. In a clinical setting, those with epilepsy may benefit from the division of the corpus callosum.

== Development ==
=== Phylogenetically ===
It is thought that a majority of existing animals, including Homo sapiens, have evolved from a common wormlike ancestor that lived around 600 million years ago, called the urbilaterian. A bilaterian animal is one that has symmetrical left and right body halves. While it is still debated whether this species had a complex brain or not, development of similar species support the hypothesis that it had at least a simple anterior collection of nerve cells, called a cephalon. Furthermore, studies have shown that this cephalon was bilateral, consisting of two or more connected sub-collections that are separated by the mid-sagittal plane, suggesting the first example of such a division.

=== Ontogenetically ===
A neural crest appears in the mammalian embryo as soon as the 20th day of development. It is during embryonic development that a neural tube appears and is folded into a hollow structure, as shown in Figure 1. This process is also known as neurulation. The neural tube is where the central nervous system forms, which later on in development will be subdivided and differentiated into distinct sections of the brain and spinal cord. These subdivisions occur by signaling molecules that direct differentiated cells to their correct location of the organism. The bilateral sides of this structure then give rise to the two hemispheres of the Homo sapiens cortex but do not merge at any point besides the corpus callosum. As a result, the longitudinal fissure is formed. The longitudinal fissure can appear as early as the eighth week of development, and distinctly separates the two hemispheres by around the tenth gestational week.

Figure 1: Early embryonic neural tube, depicting the separation of two sides

== Function ==
Essentially, the fissure's purpose is to separate the brain into two hemispheres, left and right. Through case studies of brain damage or stroke to either side of each hemisphere, there is evidence that the left side of the brain controls the right side of the body, and the right side controlling the left side of the body. Stroke patients have been found to unilateral impairment following damage to either the left or right hemisphere, this effecting the opposite side of the body. Separating each hemisphere allows for specialization of storage, procedural and cognitive function. Through "split-brain experiments", the left hemisphere is shown to specialize in mathematics, language and general logistics. The right hemisphere is further specialized, generally, in music, art, facial recognition and in most spatial events.

The longitudinal fissure also plays a role in the optic nerve tract. This is shown in (figure 4.) with the optic chiasm, which takes the nerve from the right eye to the left hemisphere and the left eye to the right hemisphere. The longitudinal fissure allows for this misdirection and crossover of nerves. The crossover seems to be counterintuitive, however it does serve an adaptive purpose. This purpose is to give us stereopsis, (depth and three-dimensional vision), as well as a development of binocular vision. These two components combined give the ability to have a larger perceived visual field, which coincides with the hypothesis that this is an adaptive function given by the fissures placement and structure. Damage to the nerve past the optic chiasm, will cause loss or impairment to the corresponding eye. If the right side of the brain is damaged and the nerve is damaged or destroyed, then the left eye will also follow the severity of damage.

== Clinical significance ==
The longitudinal fissure plays a key role in corpus callosotomy, neurosurgery resulting in split brain, as it provides unobstructed access to the corpus callosum. Corpus callosotomy is one of the procedures used for pharmacologically treating intractable epilepsy cases, and it consists of the division of the nerve fibers running between the two hemispheres through the corpus callosum. A neurosurgeon separates the two hemispheres physically by pulling them apart with special tools, and cuts through either approximately two thirds of the fibers in the case of partial callosotomy, or the entirety in the case of complete callosotomy. Without the presence of longitudinal fissure, the corpus callosotomy procedure would be significantly more challenging and dangerous, as it would require the surgeon to navigate through densely connected cortical areas. Following the procedure, the two hemispheres are no longer able to communicate with each other as before.

While patients’ brains usually adapt and allow for uninterrupted daily life, cognitive tests can easily determine whether a patient has split-brain. In an experiment involving a chimeric figure, with a woman’s face on the left half and a man’s face on the right half, a patient with split-brain focusing on the middle point will point to the woman’s face when prompted to point to the face in the picture, and will answer “a man” if asked what the picture is depicting. This is because the Fusiform Face Area (FFA) is in the right hemisphere, while language centers are predominantly in the left hemisphere.

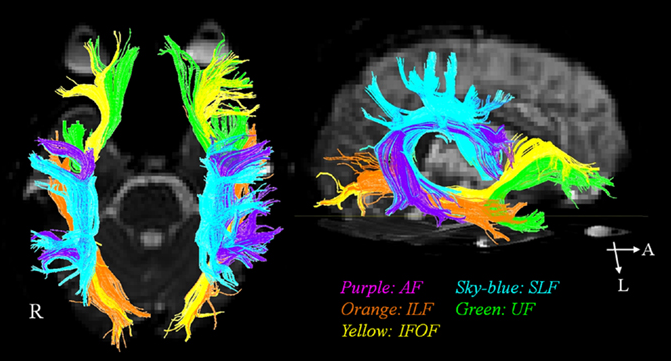
Figure 2: Diffusion tensor imaging example

=== Repetitive transcranial magnetic stimulation ===
In studies, low-frequency repetitive transcranial magnetic stimulation (rTMS) applications have been tested with various cognitive processes during time perception tasks. Studies have analyzed the effects of the low-frequency rTMS on tests of time perception when the rTMS has been applied to the "parietal medial longitudinal fissure". Findings have shown evidence to support the hypothesis that participants in this study would underestimate their perception of time for short amounts of time and overestimate for longer periods of time. Specifically, the 20 participants underestimated 1 second time intervals and overestimated 4 second/9 second intervals after applying 1-Hz rTMS.

=== Neurosurgery ===
The longitudinal fissure can serve as an effective surgical passage in the frontal bone during central and pterional craniotomies, which is opening into the skull by surgery. While there are variations in the head shapes of many species, dogs have been found to have a high variation in terms of head shapes making it difficult to find a brain surgical procedure that will work effectively for them. One goal of the study was to distinguish the longitudinal cerebral fissure anatomy and their possible variations in brachy‐(B), dolicho‐(D) and mesaticephalic‐(M) dogs. Even though the lateral cerebral fissure morphology was uniform in the dog breeds. Mesaticephalic‐(M) dogs were found to have the greatest surgical passage resulting in access to more brain structures, while the dolicho‐(D) dogs had the smallest surgical passage.

== Research ==
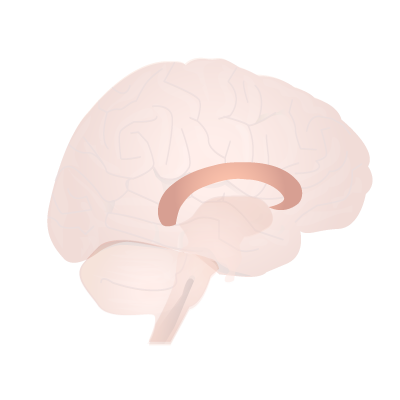
Figure 3: Area of the corpus callosum in comparison with the longitudinal fissure surface area

As the corpus callosum is substantially smaller in surface area relative to the longitudinal fissure (Figure 3), fiber bundles passing through are densely packed together, and precision tracking is essential to distinguish between the individual bundles that originate from and lead to the same cortical centers. Understanding such connections allows us to understand the contralateral concurrences and what diseases can result from lesions to them. Diffusion tensor imaging (DTI or dMRI) along with fiber-tracking (FT) algorithms and functional Magnetic Resonance Imaging (fMRI) is used to image these bundles. For instance, occipital-callosal fiber tracts were localized with 1–2 mm precision using DTI-TF techniques - which are very important for the cooperation of visual cortices, and any lesion to them can lead to alexia, the inability to read.

== Additional images ==
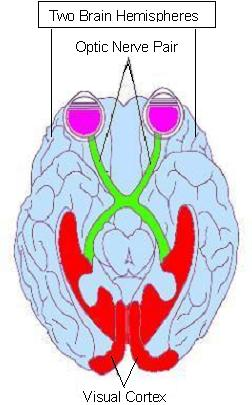
Figure 4: Optical nerve cross over

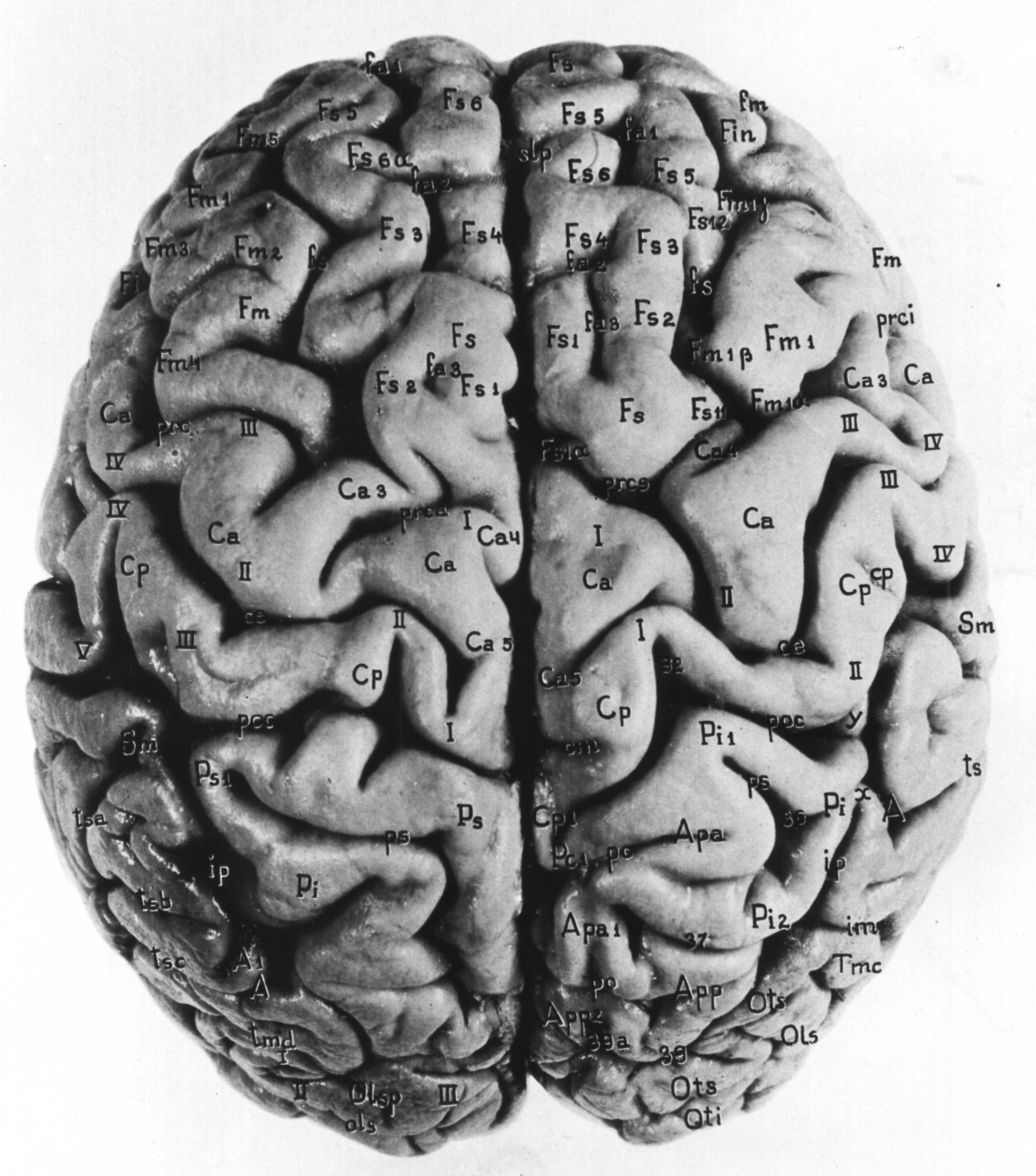
facies dorsalis cerebri gyri

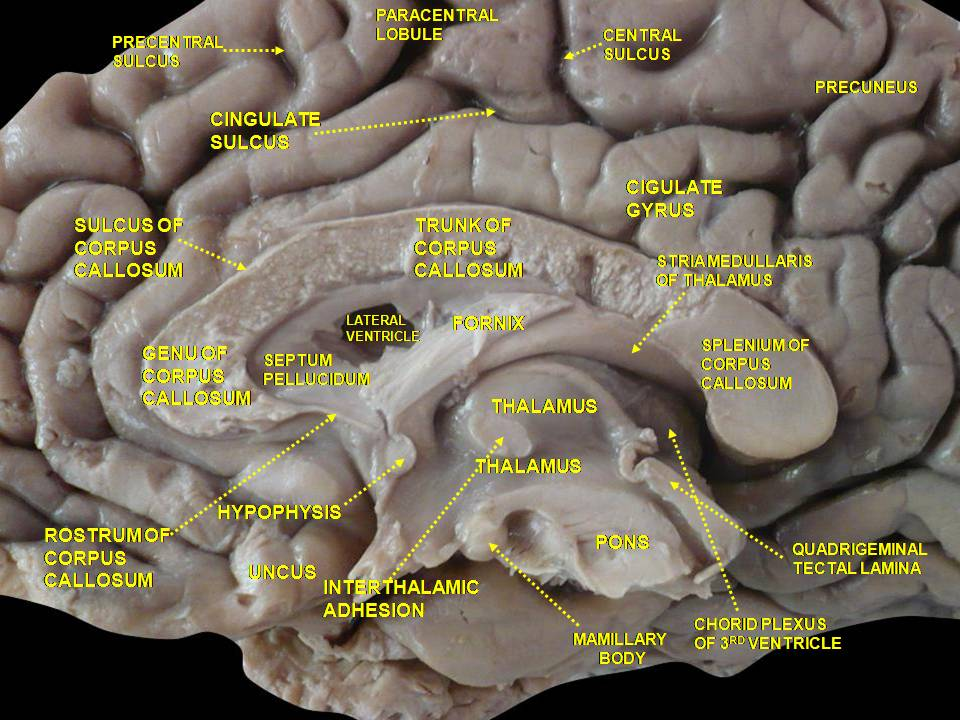
Cerebrum. Medial face. Dissection of corpus callosum etc.

Basal view of a human brain

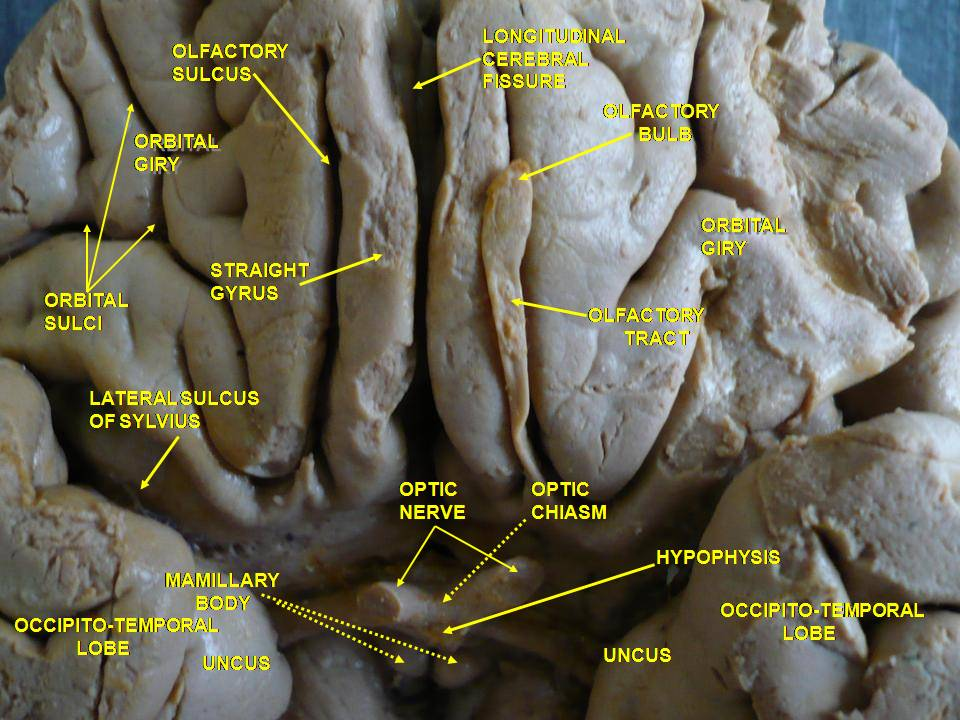
Cerebrum. Optic and olfactory nerves. Inferior view. Deep dissection.

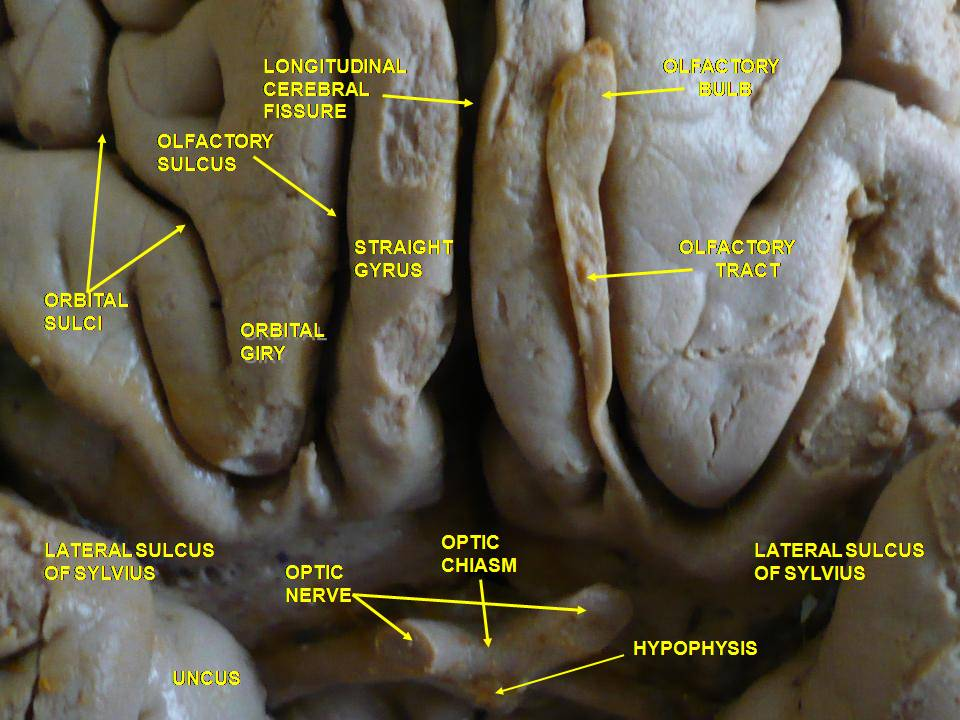
Cerebrum. Inferior view. Deep dissection.

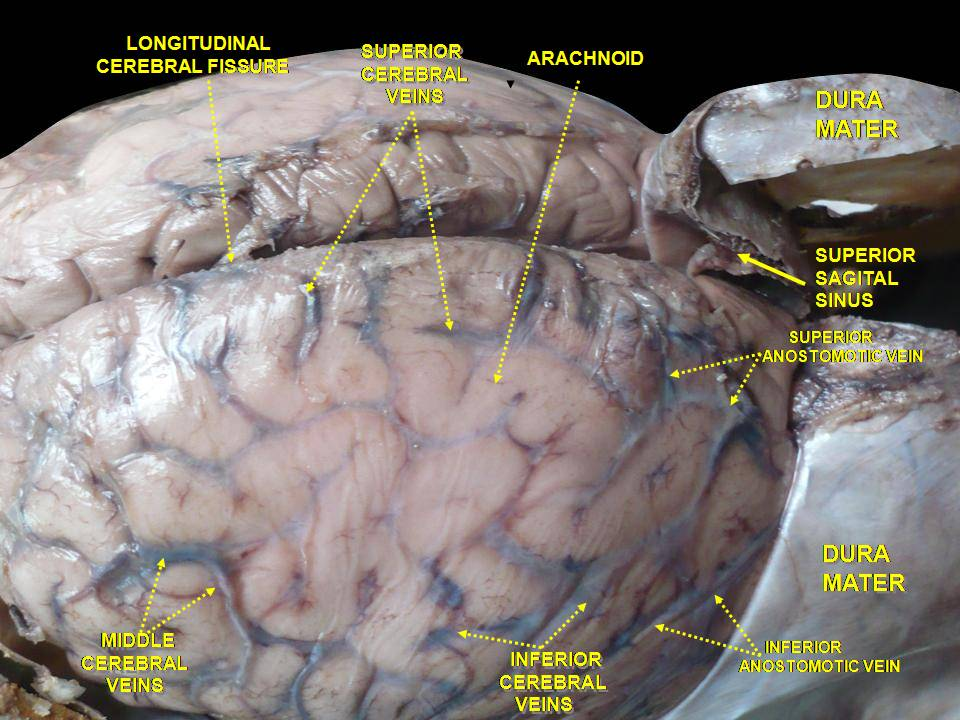
Meninges and superficial cerebral veins. Deep dissection. Superior view.

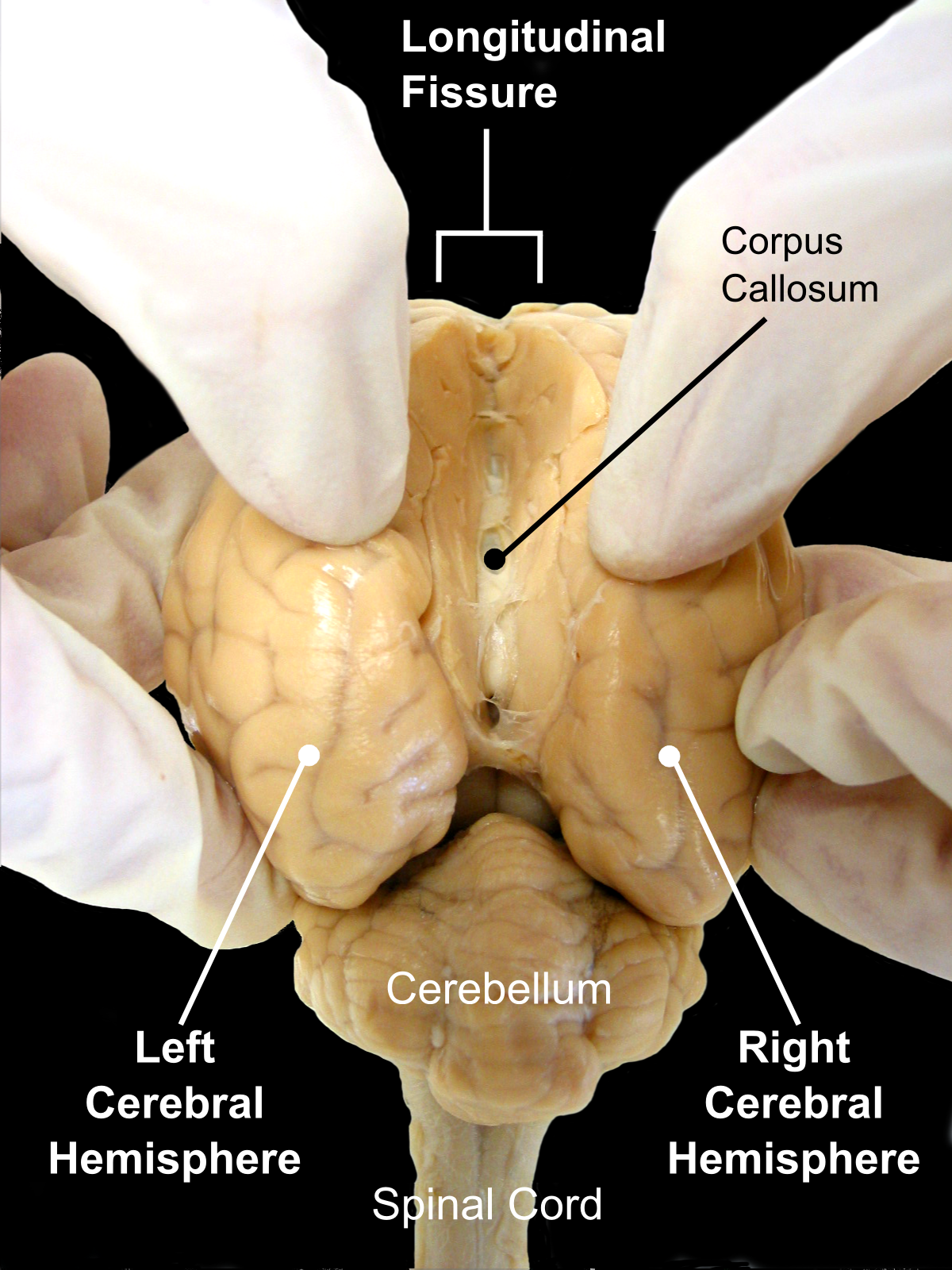
Sheep Brain Dissection with labels

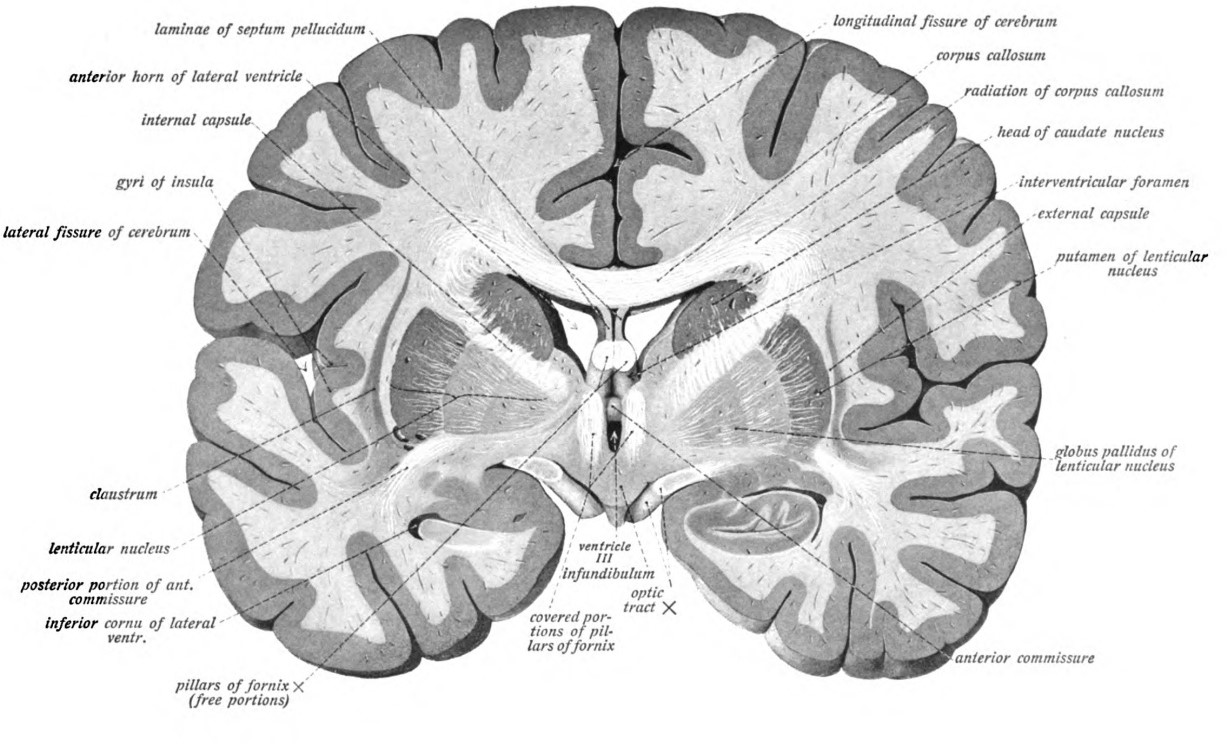
An anatomical illustration from the 1908 edition of Sobotta's Anatomy Atlas

== See also ==
- Lateralization of brain function
