= Meningeal artery =

Meningeal artery may refer to

- Anterior meningeal branch of anterior ethmoidal artery
- Meningeal branches of vertebral artery
- Middle meningeal artery
- Posterior meningeal artery
