= Inferior sagittal sinus =

Vein channel in the brain

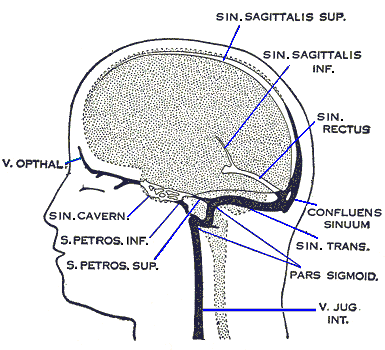
- Dural veins (Inferior sagittal sinus labeled as "SIN. SAGITTALIS INF." at upper right.)

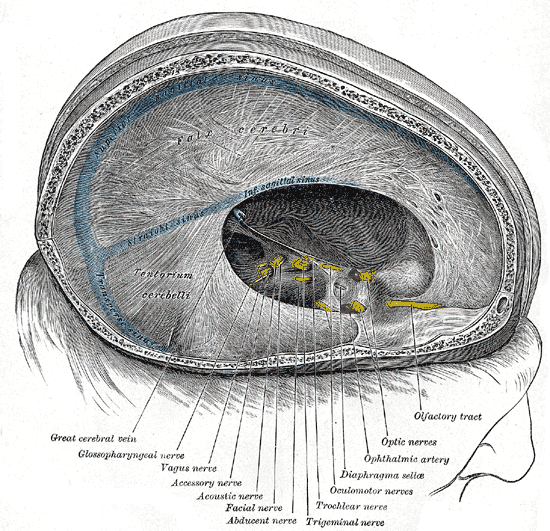
- Dura mater and its processes exposed by removing part of the right half of the skull, and the brain. (Inferior sagittal sinus visible as blue line at center.)

Details
- Drains to: Straight sinus

Identifiers
- Latin: sinus sagittalis inferior
- TA98: A12.3.05.111
- TA2: 4854
- FMA: 50768

The inferior sagittal sinus (also known as inferior longitudinal sinus), within the human head, is an area beneath the brain which allows blood to drain outwards posteriorly from the center of the head. It drains (from the center of the brain) to the straight sinus (at the back of the head), which connects to the transverse sinuses. See diagram (at right): labeled in the brain as "SIN. SAGITTALIS INF." (for Latin: sinus sagittalis inferior).

The inferior sagittal sinus courses along the inferior border of the falx cerebri, superior to the corpus callosum.

It receives blood from the deep and medial aspects of the cerebral hemispheres and drains into the straight sinus.

== Additional images ==
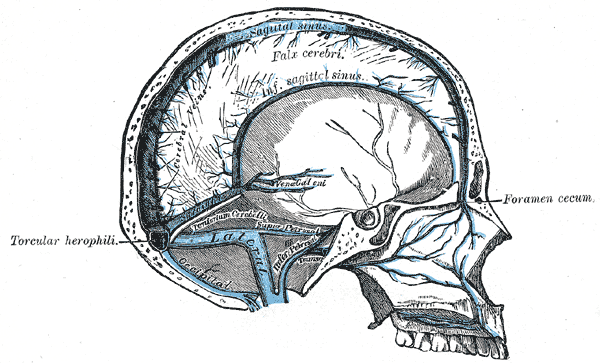
Sagittal section of the skull, showing the sinuses of the dura.

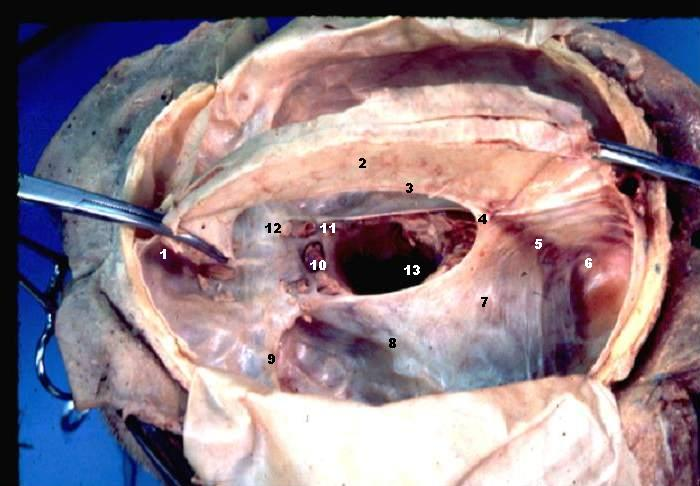
Human brain dura mater (reflections)

== See also ==
- Dural venous sinuses
- Occipital sinus
- Superficial veins of the brain
