= Occipital crest =

Occipital crest or ridge may refer to:

- External occipital crest
- Internal occipital crest
