= Falx (disambiguation) =

Falx may refer to:

- Falciform ligament, a ligament of the liver
- Falx, a sickle, scythe or sickle-like weapon used by Dacians
- Falx cerebelli and falx cerebri, two parts of the dura mater of the brain
- Foramen ovale (heart), a fetal cardiac shunt, also called the falx septi
- Nu Persei
- Conjoint tendon, a sickle-shaped tendon of the transversus abdominis muscle, also called the inguinal aponeurotic falx
- Chelicerae, mouthparts of certain arthropods
