= Internal occipital crest =

Ridge of the occipital bone

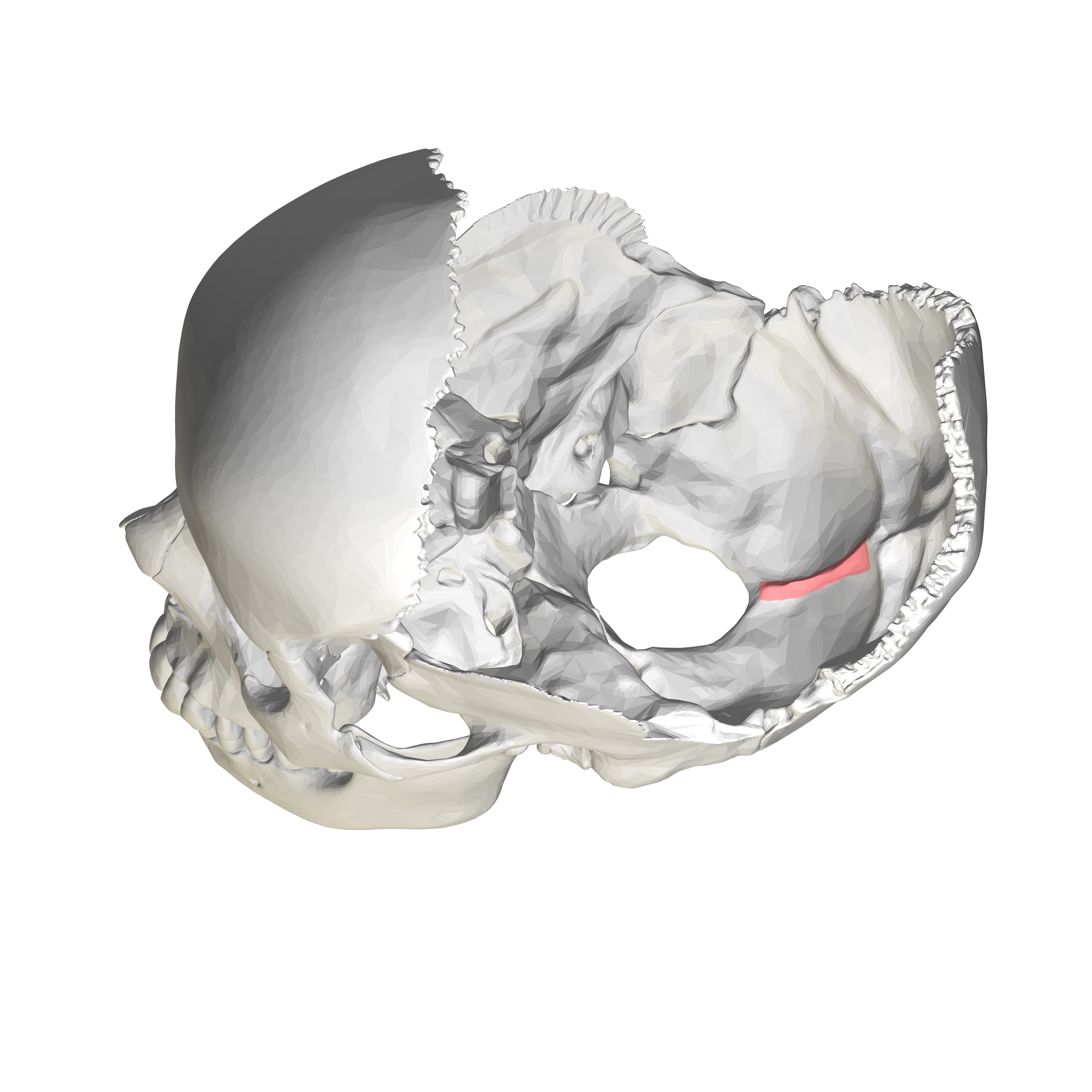
- Human skull side view (parietal bones removed). Position of internal occipital crest shown in red.

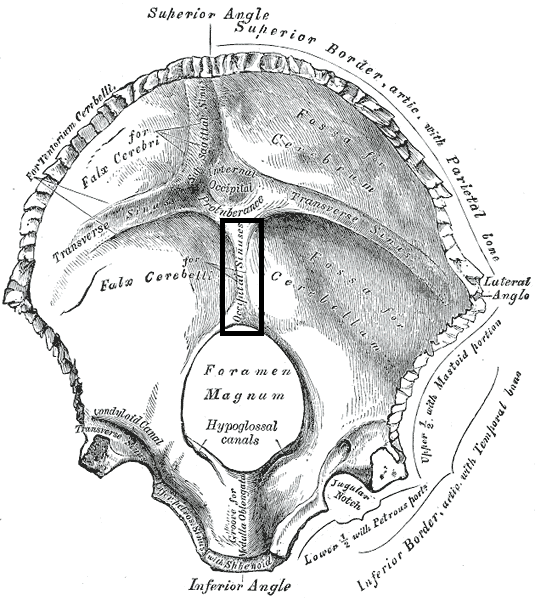
- Occipital bone. Inner surface. (Position of internal occipital crest labeled as occipital sinus at center.)

Details

Identifiers
- Latin: crista occipitalis interna
- TA98: A02.1.04.030
- TA2: 576
- FMA: 75043

In the occipital bone, the lower division of the cruciate eminence is prominent, and is named the internal occipital crest; it bifurcates near the foramen magnum and gives attachment to the falx cerebelli; in the attached margin of this falx is the occipital sinus, which is sometimes duplicated.

In the upper part of the internal occipital crest, a small depression is sometimes distinguishable; it is termed the vermian fossa since it is occupied by part of the cerebellar vermis of the cerebellum.

== Additional images ==
Position of internal occipital crest (shown in red). Animation.

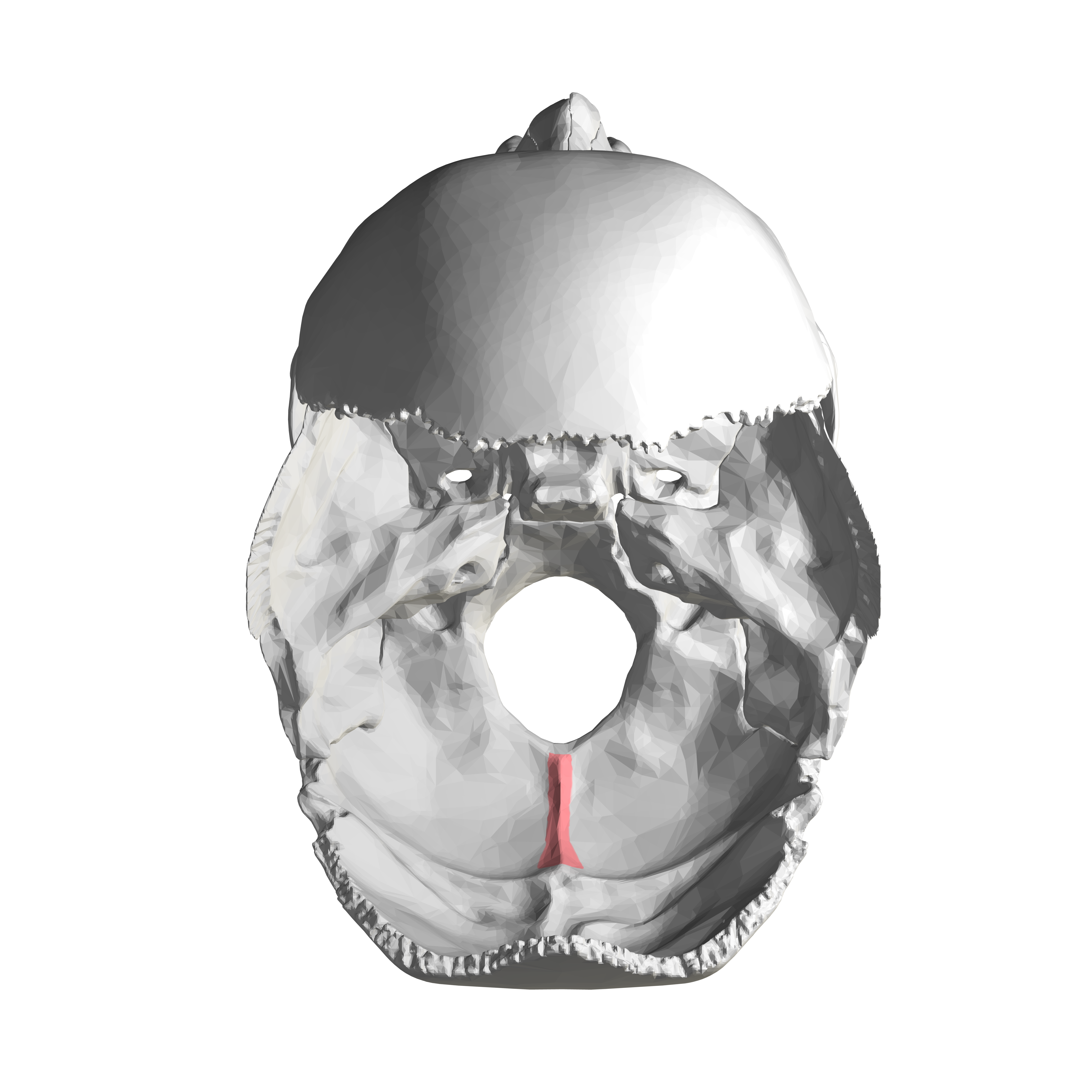
Base of the skull. Internal occipital crest shown in red.

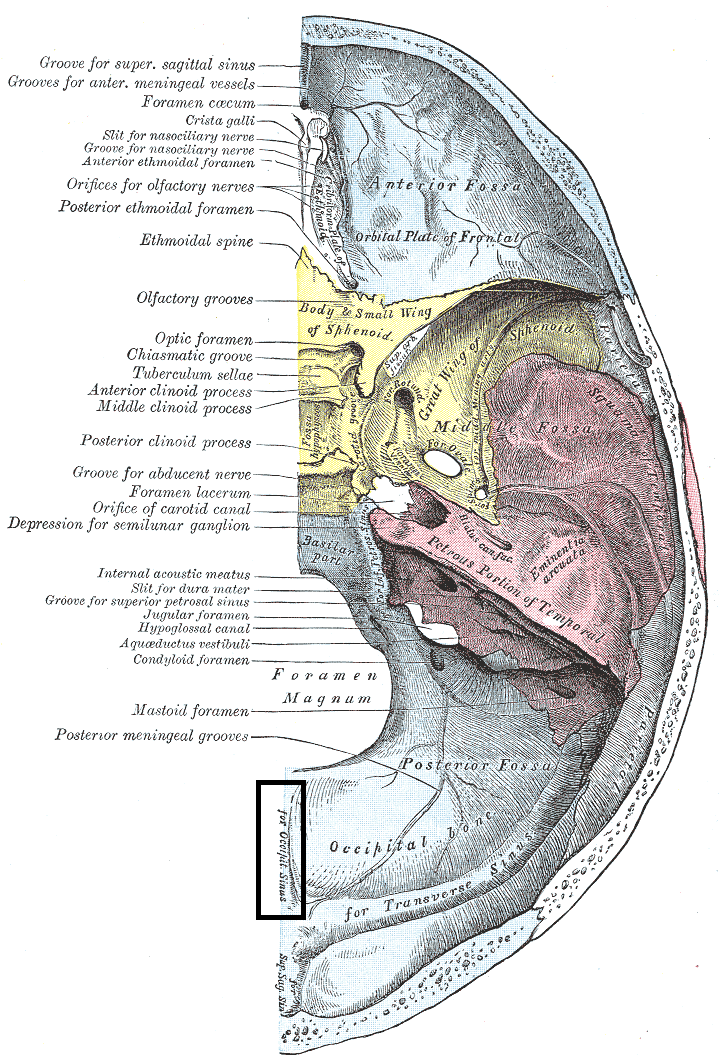
Base of the skull. Upper surface. (Internal occipital crest visible below foramen magnum.)

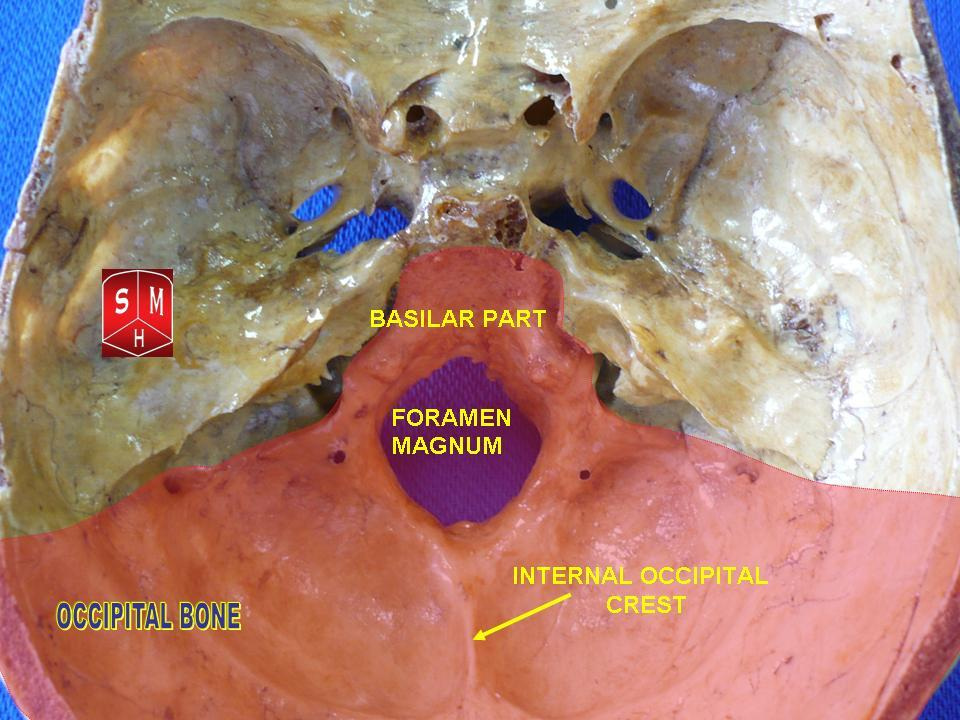
Base of the skull. Internal occipital crest labelled at bottom.
