= Dura mater =

Outermost layer of the protective tissues around the central nervous system (meninges)

- Meninges of the central nervous system

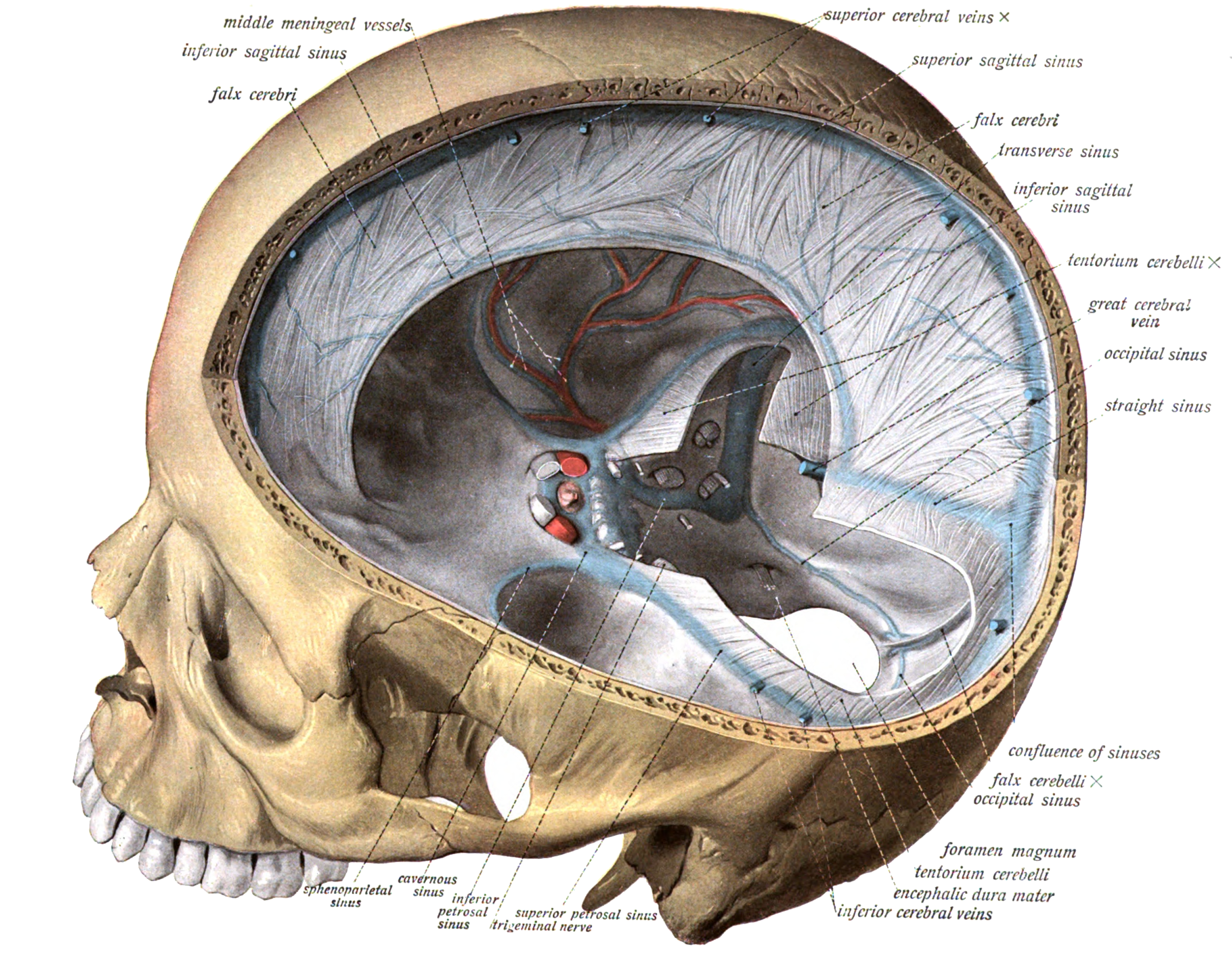
- The dura mater extends into the skull cavity as the dural reflections of the falx cerebri and tentorium cerebelli

Details
- Pronunciation: UK: /ˈdjʊərə ˈmeɪtər/, US: /- ˈmætər/
- Precursor: Neural crest
- Part of: Meninges surrounding the brain and spinal cord

Identifiers
- Latin: dura mater
- MeSH: D004388
- TA98: A14.1.01.101; A14.1.01.002
- TA2: 5370
- FMA: 9592

The dura mater (or just dura) is the outermost of the three meningeal membranes. The dura mater has two layers, an outer periosteal layer closely adhered to the neurocranium, and an inner meningeal layer known as the dural border cell layer. The two dural layers are for the most part fused together forming a thick fibrous tissue membrane that covers the brain and the vertebrae of the spinal column. But the layers are separated at the dural venous sinuses to allow blood to drain from the brain. The dura covers the arachnoid mater and the pia mater, the other two meninges, in protecting the central nervous system.

At major boundaries of brain regions such as the longitudinal fissure between the hemispheres, and the tentorium cerebelli between the posterior brain and the cerebellum the dura separates, folds and invaginates to make the divisions. These folds are known as dural folds, or reflections.

The dura mater is primarily derived from neural crest cells, with postnatal contributions from the paraxial mesoderm.

== Structure ==
The dura mater has several functions and layers. The dura mater is a membrane that envelops the arachnoid mater. It surrounds and supports the dural venous sinuses that reabsorbs cerebrospinal fluid and carries the cerebral venous return, back toward the heart.

Cranial dura mater has two layers which include a superficial periosteal layer that is actually the inner periosteum of the neurocranium (the calvaria and endocranium); and a deep meningeal layer, which is the true dura mater. The dura mater covering the spinal cord is known as the dural sac or thecal sac, and only has one layer (the meningeal layer) unlike cranial dura mater. The potential space between these two layers is known as the epidural space, which can accumulate blood in the case of traumatic laceration to the meningeal arteries.

=== Folds and reflections ===
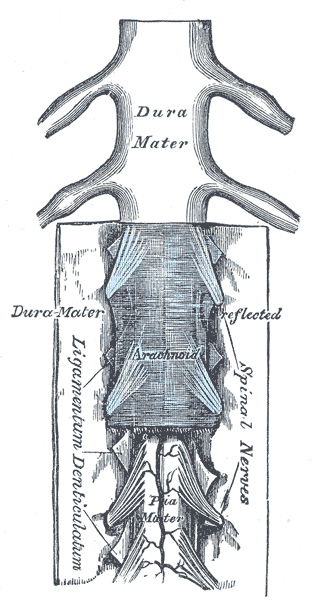
Spinal reflections and folds

The dura separates into two layers at dural reflections (also known as dural folds), places where the inner dural layer is reflected as sheet-like protrusions into the cranial cavity. There are two main dural reflections:

- The tentorium cerebelli exists between and separates the cerebellum and brainstem from the occipital lobes of the cerebrum.
- The falx cerebri, which separates the two hemispheres of the brain, is located in the longitudinal cerebral fissure between the hemispheres.

Two other dural infoldings are the cerebellar falx and the sellar diaphragm:

- The cerebellar falx (falx cerebelli) is a vertical dural infolding that lies inferior to the cerebellar tentorium in the posterior part of the posterior cranial fossa. It partially separates the cerebellar hemispheres.
- The sellar diaphragm is the smallest dural infolding and is a circular sheet of dura that is suspended between the clinoid processes, forming a partial roof over the hypophysial fossa. The sellar diaphragm covers the pituitary gland in this fossa and has an aperture for passage of the infundibulum (pituitary stalk) and hypophysial veins.

=== Blood supply ===
This depends upon the area of the cranial cavity:

- In the anterior cranial fossa, the anterior meningeal artery (branching from the anterior ethmoidal artery) is responsible for blood supply
- In the middle cranial fossa, the middle meningeal artery and some accessory arteries are responsible for blood supply. The middle meningeal artery is a direct branch from the maxillary artery and enters the cranial cavity through the foramen spinosum. It then divides into anterior (which runs usually in vertical direction across the pterion) and posterior (which runs posterosuperiorly) branches. The accessory meningeal arteries (which are branches from the maxillary artery) enter the skull through foramen ovale and supply the area between the two foramina
- In the posterior cranial fossa, four different arteries are responsible for the blood supply to the dura mater:
1. posterior meningeal artery (from the ascending pharyngeal artery through the jugular foramen)
2. meningeal arteries (from the ascending pharyngeal artery through hypoglossal canal)
3. meningeal arteries (from the occipital artery through jugular or mastoid foramen)
4. meningeal arteries (from the vertebral artery through foramen magnum)

=== Drainage ===
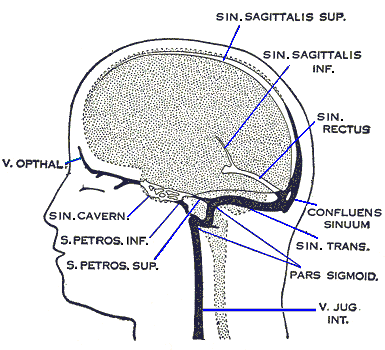

The two layers of dura mater run together throughout most of the skull. Where they separate, the gap between them is called a dural venous sinus. These sinuses drain blood and cerebrospinal fluid (CSF) from the brain and empty into the internal jugular vein.

Arachnoid villi, which are outgrowths of the arachnoid mater (the middle meningeal layer), extend into the dural venous sinuses to drain CSF. These villi act as one-way valves. Meningeal veins, which course through the dura mater, and bridging veins, which drain the underlying neural tissue and puncture the dura mater, empty into these dural sinuses. A rupture of a bridging vein causes a subdural hematoma.

=== Nerve supply ===
The supratentorial dura mater membrane is supplied by small meningeal branches of the trigeminal nerve (V1, V2 and V3). The innervation for the infratentorial dura mater are via upper cervical nerves and the meningeal branch of the vagus nerve.

== Clinical significance ==
Many medical conditions involve the dura mater. A subdural hematoma occurs when there is an abnormal collection of blood between the dura and the arachnoid, usually as a result of torn bridging veins secondary to head trauma. An epidural hematoma is a collection of blood between the dura and the inner surface of the skull, and is usually due to arterial bleeding. Intradural procedures, such as removal of a brain tumour or treatment of trigeminal neuralgia via a microvascular decompression, require that an incision is made to the dura mater. To achieve a watertight repair and avoid potential post-operative complications, the dura is typically closed with sutures. If there is a dural deficiency, then a dural substitute may be used to replace this membrane. Small gaps in the dura can be covered with a surgical sealant film.

In 2011, researchers discovered a connective tissue bridge from the rectus capitis posterior major to the cervical dura mater. Various clinical manifestations may be linked to this anatomical relationship such as headaches, trigeminal neuralgia and other symptoms that involved the cervical dura. The rectus capitis posterior minor has a similar attachment.

The dura-muscular, dura-ligamentous connections in the upper cervical spine and occipital areas may provide anatomic and physiologic answers to the cause of the cervicogenic headache. This proposal would further explain manipulation's efficacy in the treatment of cervicogenic headache.

The American Red Cross and some other agencies accepting blood donations consider dura mater transplants, along with receipt of pituitary-derived growth hormone, a risk factor due to concerns about Creutzfeldt–Jakob disease.

Cerebellar tonsillar ectopia, or Chiari malformation, is a condition that was previously thought to be congenital but can be induced by trauma, particularly whiplash trauma. Dural strain may be pulling the cerebellum inferiorly, or skull distortions may be pushing the brain inferiorly.

Dural ectasia is the enlargement of the dura and is common in connective tissue disorders, such as Marfan syndrome and Ehlers–Danlos syndrome. These conditions are sometimes found in conjunction with Arnold–Chiari malformation.

Spontaneous cerebrospinal fluid leak is the fluid and pressure loss of spinal fluid due to holes in the dura mater.

== Etymology ==
The name dura mater derives from the Latin for tough mother (or hard mother), a loan translation of Arabic أم الدماغ الصفيقة (umm al-dimāgh al-ṣafīqah), literally 'thick mother of the brain', matrix of the brain, and is also referred to by the term "pachymeninx" (plural "pachymeninges").

== Additional images ==
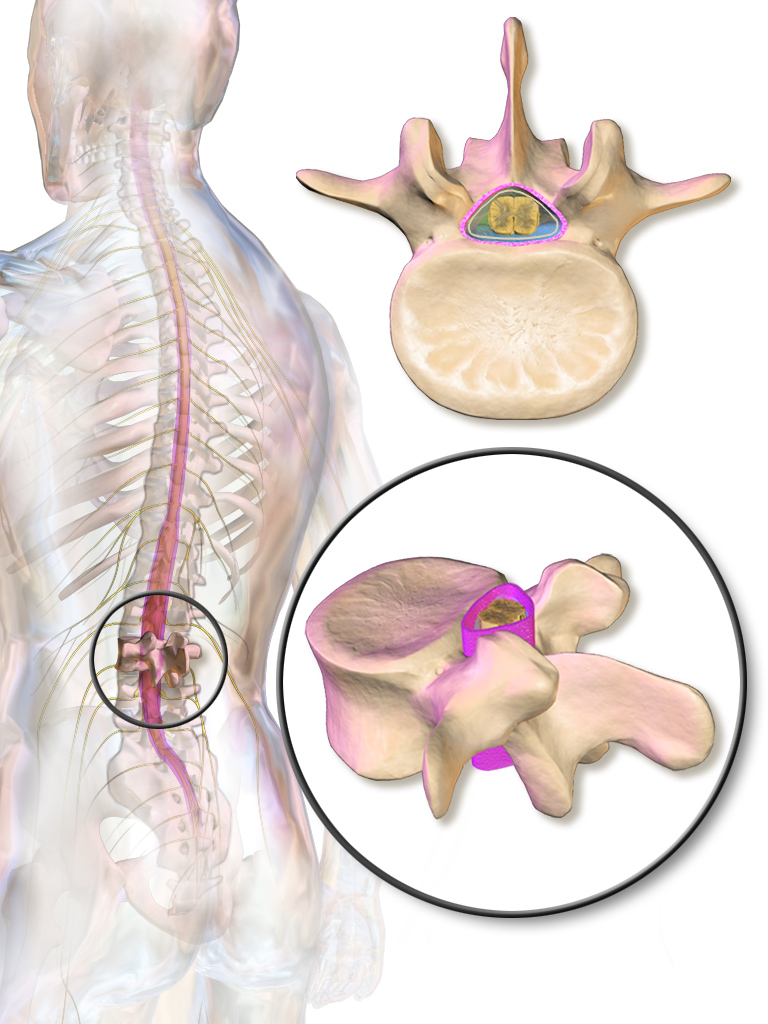
Dura mater (spinal section)

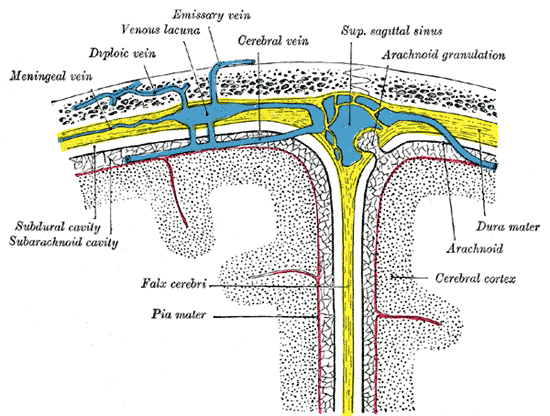
Diagrammatic representation of a section across the top of the skull, showing the membranes of the brain, etc.

Diagrammatic transverse section of the medulla spinalis and its membranes

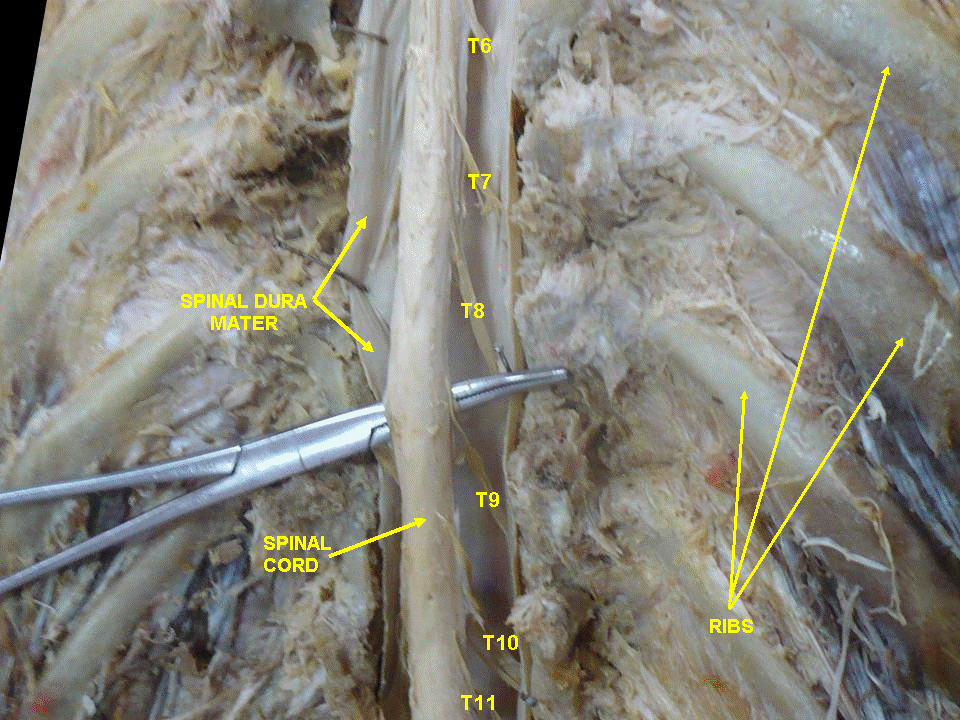
Spinal cord. Spinal membranes and nerve roots. Deep dissection. Posterior view.

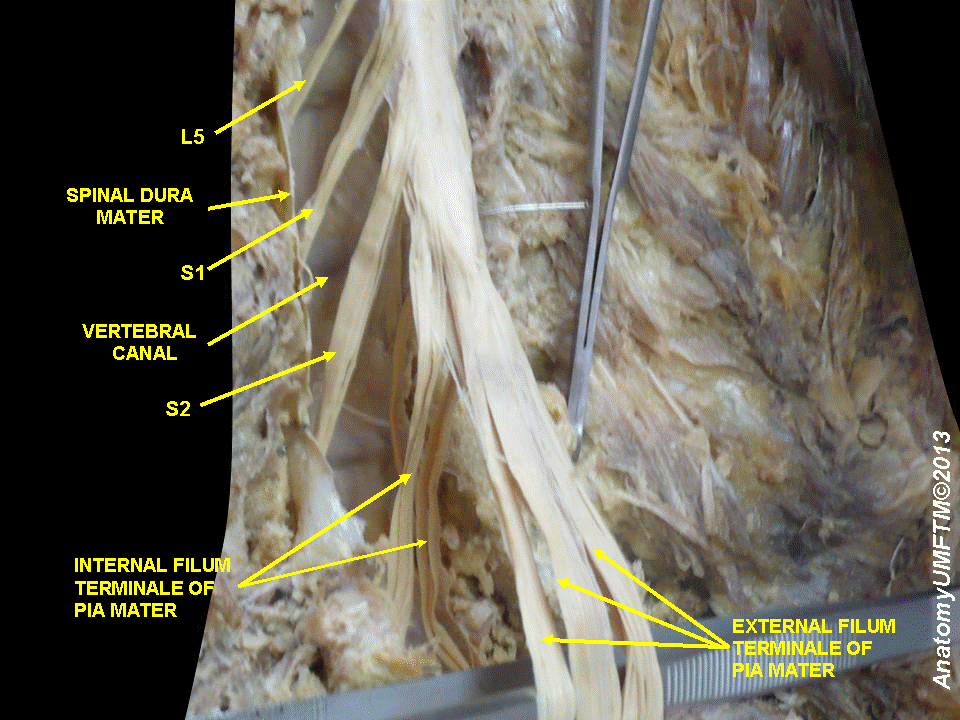
Spinal cord. Spinal membranes and nerve roots. Deep dissection. Posterior view

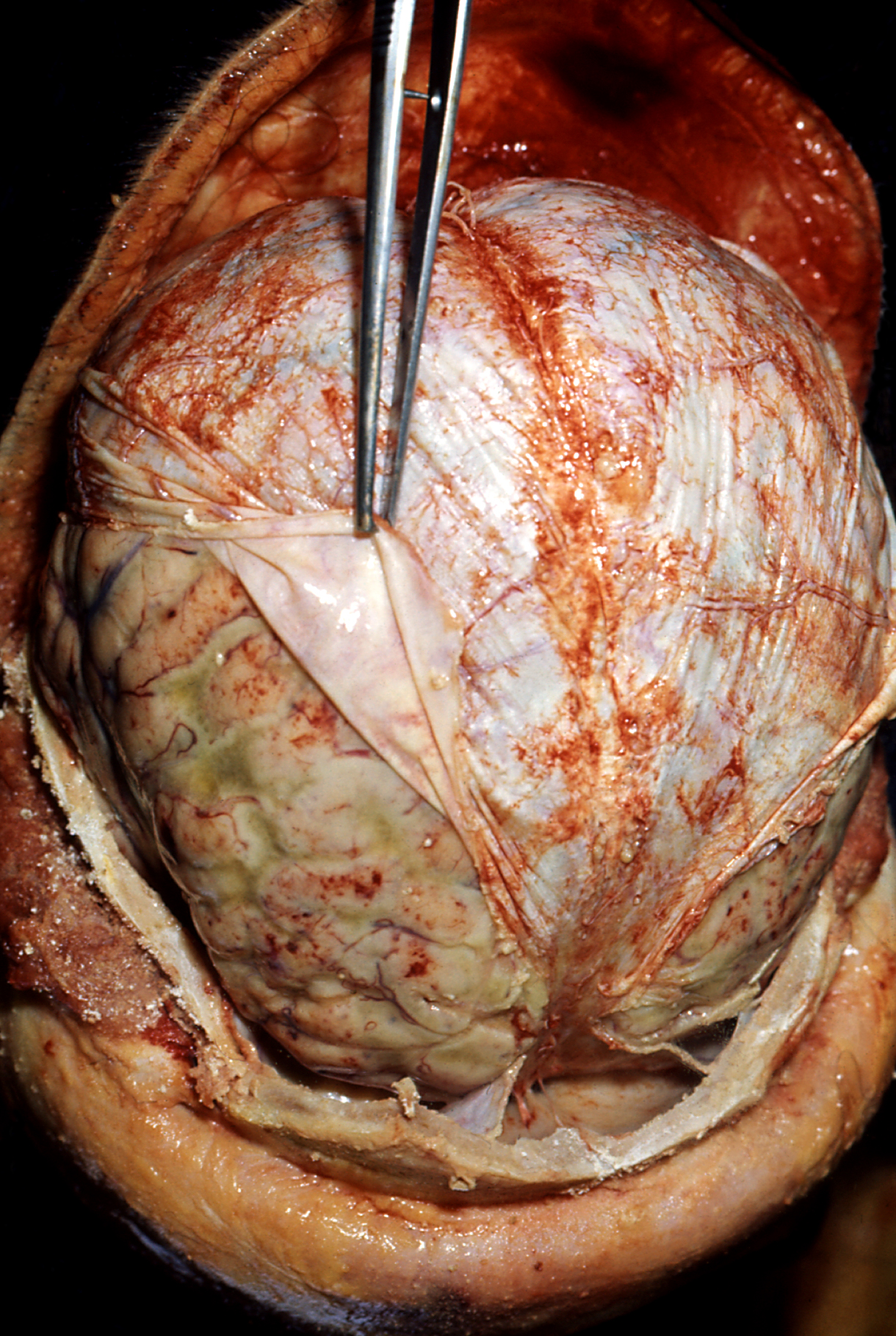
Autopsy. Dura mater is retracted by the forceps.
