= Confluence of sinuses =

Venous sinus in the skull

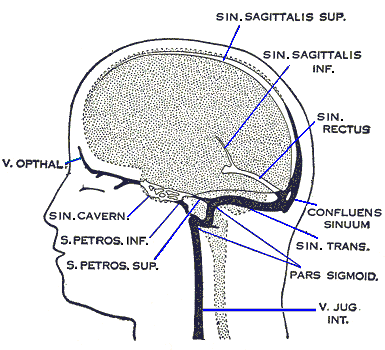
- Dural veins. (Labeled with "confluens sinuum")

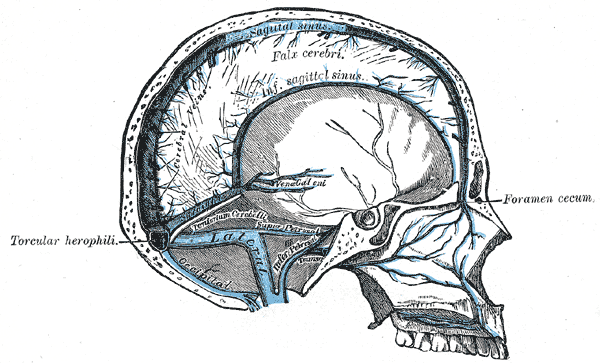
- Sagittal section of the skull, showing the sinuses of the dura. (Labeled with "torcula herophili".)

Details
- Source: Superior sagittal sinus, straight sinus, occipital sinus
- Drains to: Transverse sinuses

Identifiers
- Latin: confluens sinuum, torcula herophili
- TA98: A12.3.05.103
- TA2: 4852
- FMA: 50784

The confluence of sinuses (Latin: confluens sinuum), torcular Herophili, or torcula is the connecting point of the superior sagittal sinus, straight sinus, and occipital sinus. It is below the internal occipital protuberance of the skull. It drains venous blood from the brain into the transverse sinuses. It may be affected by arteriovenous fistulas, a thrombus, major trauma, or surgical damage, and may be imaged with many radiology techniques.

== Structure ==
The confluence of sinuses is found deep to the internal occipital protuberance of the occipital bone of the skull. This puts it inferior to the occipital lobes of the brain, and posterosuperior to the cerebellum. It connects the ends of the superior sagittal sinus, the straight sinus, and the occipital sinus. Blood from it can drain into the left and right transverse sinuses. It is lined with endothelium, with some smooth muscle.

=== Variation ===
The confluence of sinuses shows significant variation. Most commonly, there is a continuous connection between all of the sinuses. A very common variant is the superior sagittal sinus only draining into the right transverse sinus - more rarely, it may also only drain into the left transverse sinus. Another variation involves a continuous connection, but where most blood from the superior sagittal sinus drains into the right transverse sinus, and most blood from the occipital sinus drains into the left transverse sinus. Other less common variations also exist.

=== Development ===
The confluence of sinuses develops from the anterior plexus and the middle plexus. These fuse so that the anterior plexus becomes a remnant.

== Function ==
The confluence of sinuses is important in drainage of venous blood from the brain. It drains most of the blood from the brain.

== Clinical significance ==
The confluence of sinuses may be affected by arteriovenous fistulas. This is treated with surgery to embolise of the fistula. It may also be affected by a thrombus. This can be treated with anticoagulants. It may be injured by a variety of major trauma. It may also be damaged during surgery, such as that to remove a meningioma.

The confluence of sinuses can be imaged with radiology. Angiography, CT scan, magnetic resonance imaging, medical ultrasound, or interventional radiology may be used.

== History ==
The confluence of sinuses may also be known as the confluens sinuum (from Latin), or the torcular Herophili (or more simply the torcula). The last term is older, and describes the veins as a gutter or canal. This is named after Herophilos, the Greek anatomist who first used cadavers for the systematic study of anatomy. This term more precisely refers to the concavity in the bone, which is the location of the confluence of sinuses.

== Additional images ==
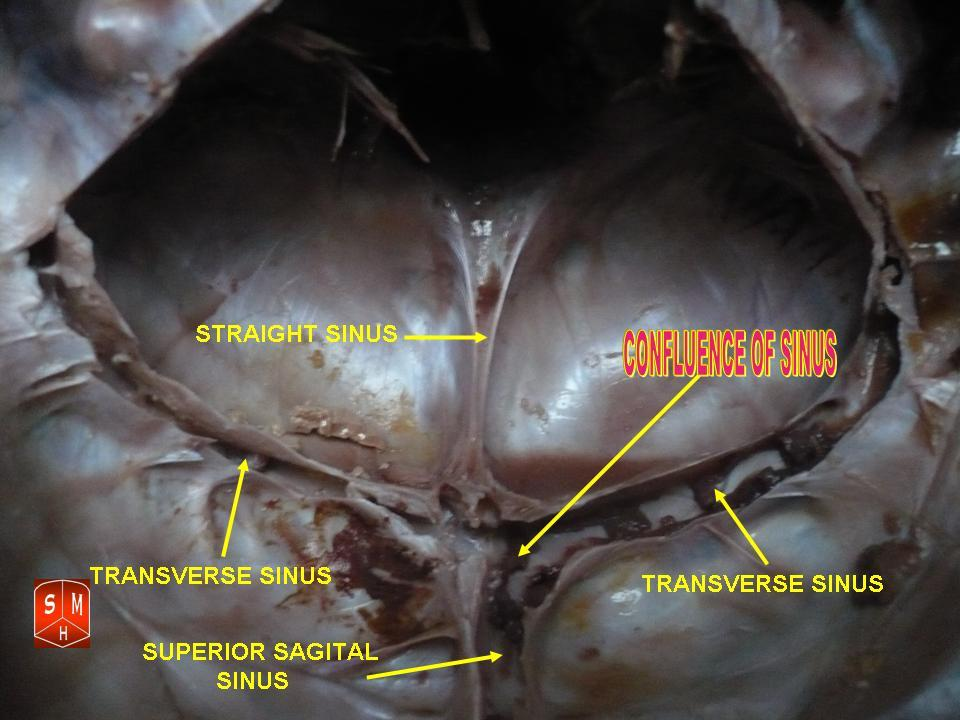
Confluence of sinuses
