= Dural venous sinuses =

Venous channels in the dura mater

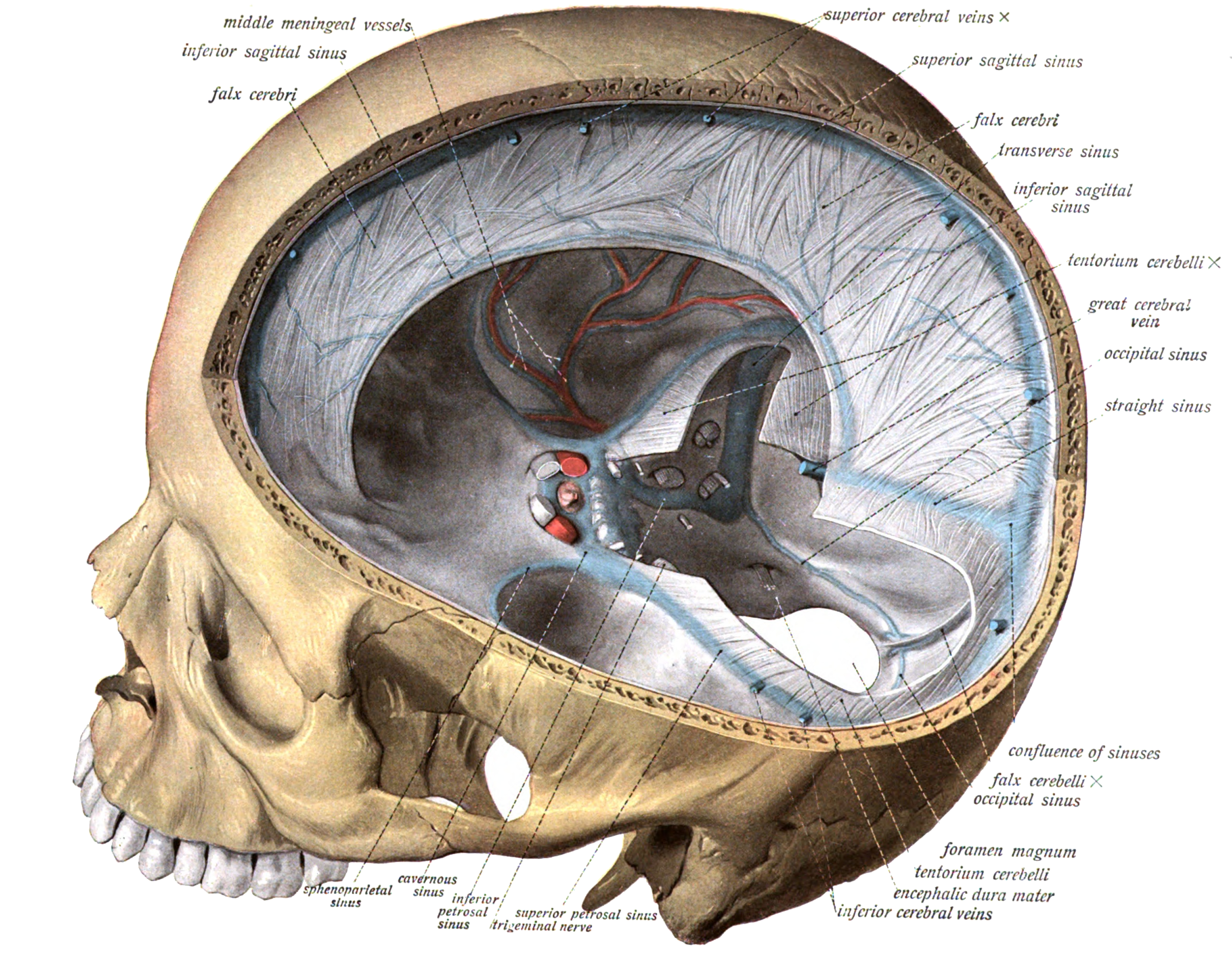
- Illustration of the dural venous sinuses

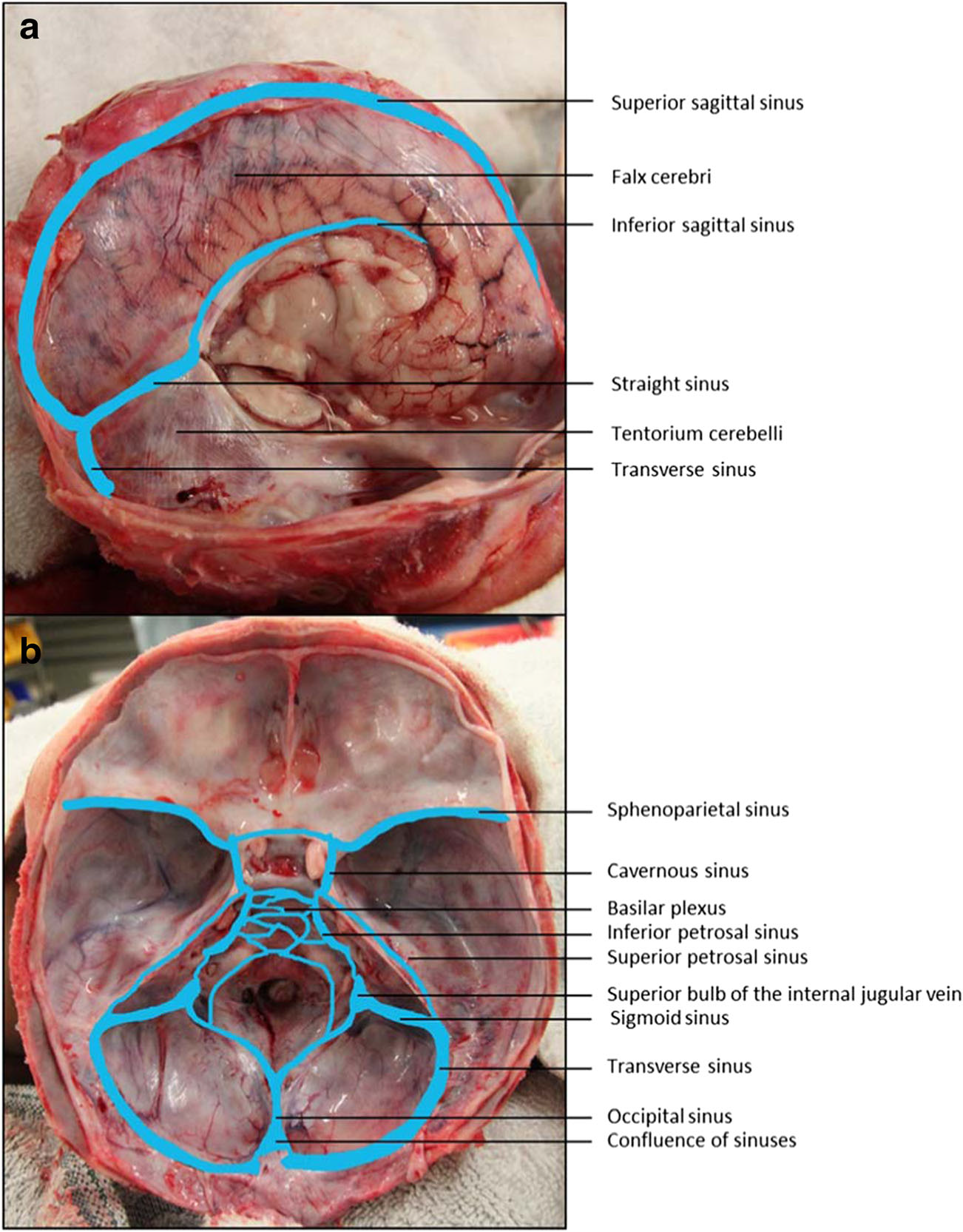
- Dural venous sinuses

Details

Identifiers
- Latin: sinus durae matris
- MeSH: D003392
- TA98: A12.3.05.101
- TA2: 4846
- FMA: 76590

The dural venous sinuses (also called dural sinuses, cerebral sinuses, or cranial sinuses) are venous sinuses (channels) found between the periosteal and meningeal layers of dura mater in the brain. They receive blood from the cerebral veins, and cerebrospinal fluid (CSF) from the subarachnoid space via arachnoid granulations. They mainly empty into the internal jugular vein. Cranial venous sinuses communicate with veins outside the skull through emissary veins. These communications help to keep the pressure of blood in the sinuses constant.

The major dural venous sinuses included the superior sagittal sinus, inferior sagittal sinus, transverse sinus, straight sinus, sigmoid sinus and cavernous sinus. These sinuses play a crucial role in cerebral venous drainage. A dural venous sinus, in human anatomy, is any of the channels of a branching complex sinus network that lies between layers of the dura mater, the outermost covering of the brain, and functions to collect oxygen-depleted blood. Unlike veins, these sinuses possess no muscular coat.

== Venous sinuses ==
Name	Drains to
Anterior
Sphenoparietal sinuses	Cavernous sinuses
Cavernous sinus	Superior and inferior petrosal sinuses
Midline
Superior sagittal sinus	Typically becomes right transverse sinus or confluence of sinuses
Inferior sagittal sinus	Straight sinus
Straight sinus	Typically becomes left transverse sinus or confluence of sinuses
Posterior
Occipital sinus	Confluence of sinuses
Confluence of sinuses	Right and left transverse sinuses
Lateral
Superior petrosal sinus	Transverse sinuses
Transverse sinuses	Sigmoid sinus
Inferior petrosal sinus	Internal jugular vein
Sigmoid sinuses	Internal jugular vein

Paired venous sinus

== Structure ==
The walls of the dural venous sinuses are composed of dura mater lined with endothelium, a specialized layer of flattened cells found in blood and lymph vessels. They differ from other blood vessels in that they lack a full set of vessel layers (e.g. tunica media) characteristic of arteries and veins. They also lack valves (in veins; with exception of materno-fetal blood circulation i.e. placental artery and pulmonary arteries both of which carry deoxygenated blood).

== Clinical relevance ==
The sinuses can be injured by trauma in which damage to the dura mater, may result in blood clot formation (thrombosis) within the dural sinuses. Other common causes of dural sinus thrombosis include tracking of infection through the ophthalmic vein in orbital cellulitis. While rare, dural sinus thrombosis may lead to hemorrhagic infarction or cerebral edema with serious consequences including epilepsy, neurological deficits, or death.

== Additional images ==
Dural sinuses.

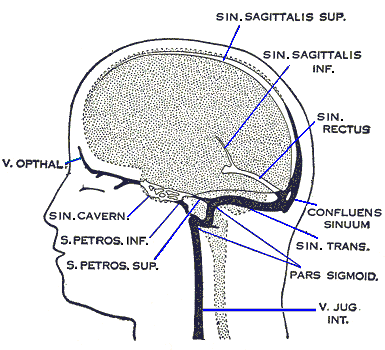
Dural veins.

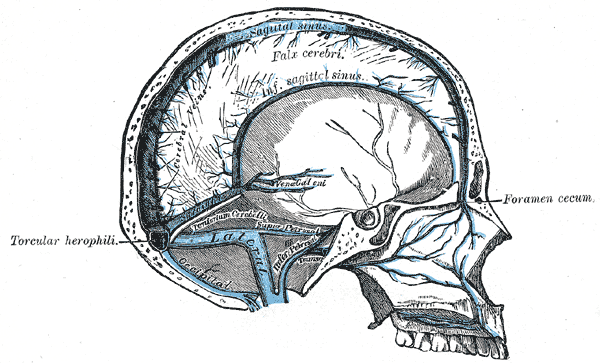
Sagittal section of the skull, showing the sinuses of the dura.

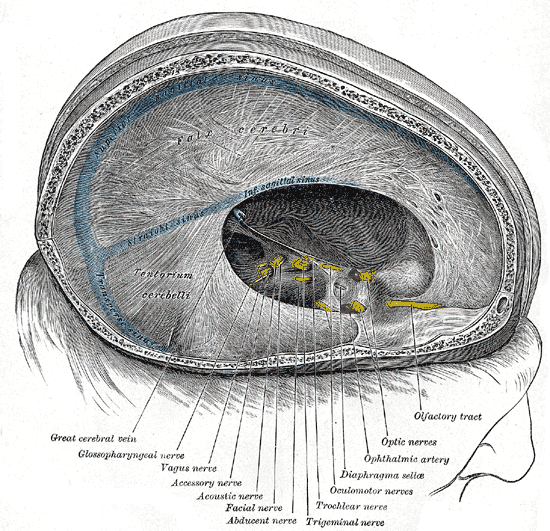
Dura mater and its processes exposed by removing part of the right half of the skull, and the brain.

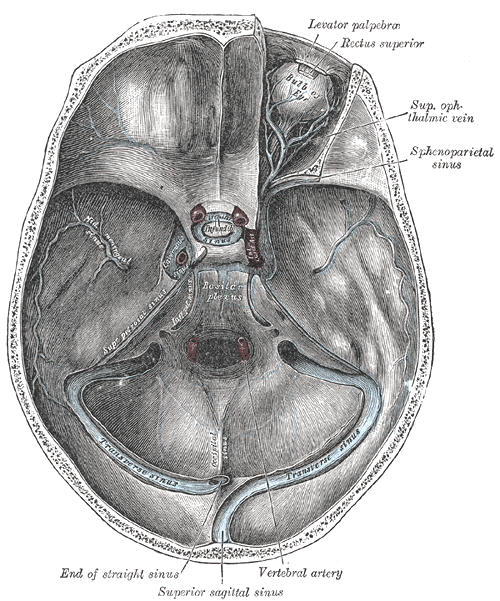
The sinuses at the base of the skull.

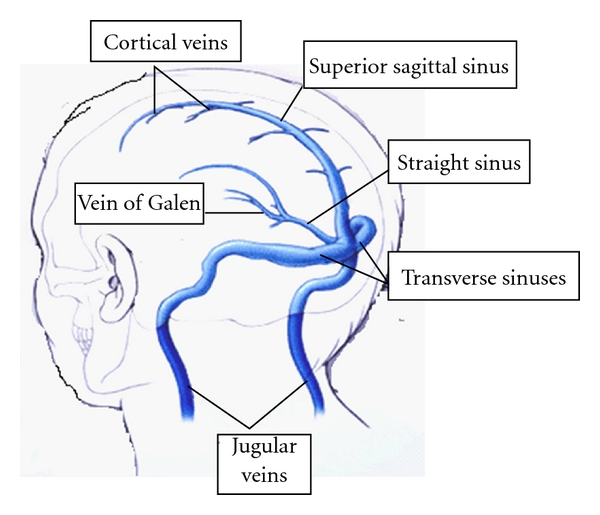
Major sinuses and their tributaries.
