= Occipital sinus =

Vein channel in the brain

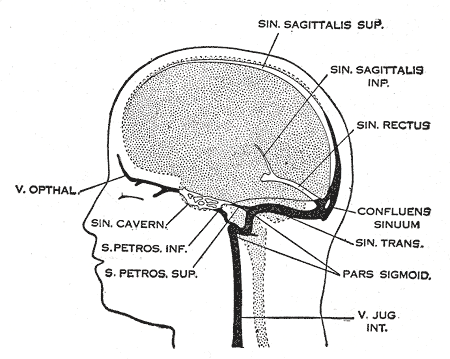
- Dural veins

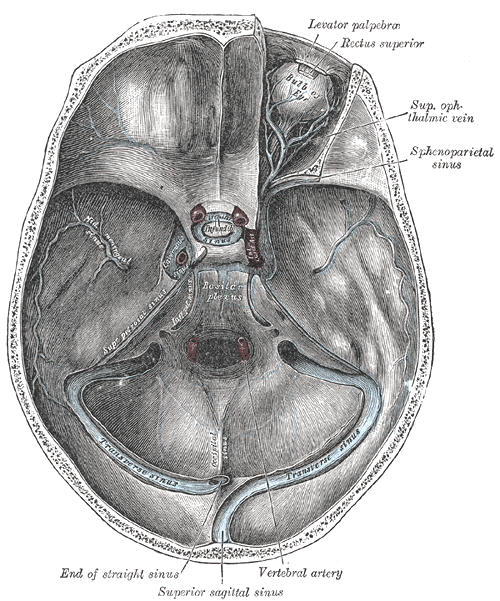
- The sinuses at the base of the skull. (Occipial sinus visible at bottom center, below the foramen magnum on image.)

Details
- Drains to: Confluence of sinuses

Identifiers
- Latin: sinus occipitalis
- TA98: A12.3.05.105
- TA2: 4855
- FMA: 50781

The occipital sinus is the smallest of the dural venous sinuses. It is usually unpaired, and is sometimes altogether absent. It is situated in the attached margin of the falx cerebelli. It commences near the foramen magnum, and ends by draining into the confluence of sinuses.

Occipital sinuses were discovered by Guichard Joseph Duverney.

== Anatomy ==
The occipital sinus is present in around 65% of individuals. It is usually single, but occasionally paired.

It is situated in the attached margin of the falx cerebelli.

=== Course ===
The occipital sinus commences around the margin of the foramen magnum by several small venous channels (one of which joins the terminal part of the sigmoid sinus). It terminates by draining into the confluence of the sinuses.

=== Communications ===
The occipital sinus communicates with the marginal sinus, and posterior internal vertebral venous plexuses.

== Additional images ==
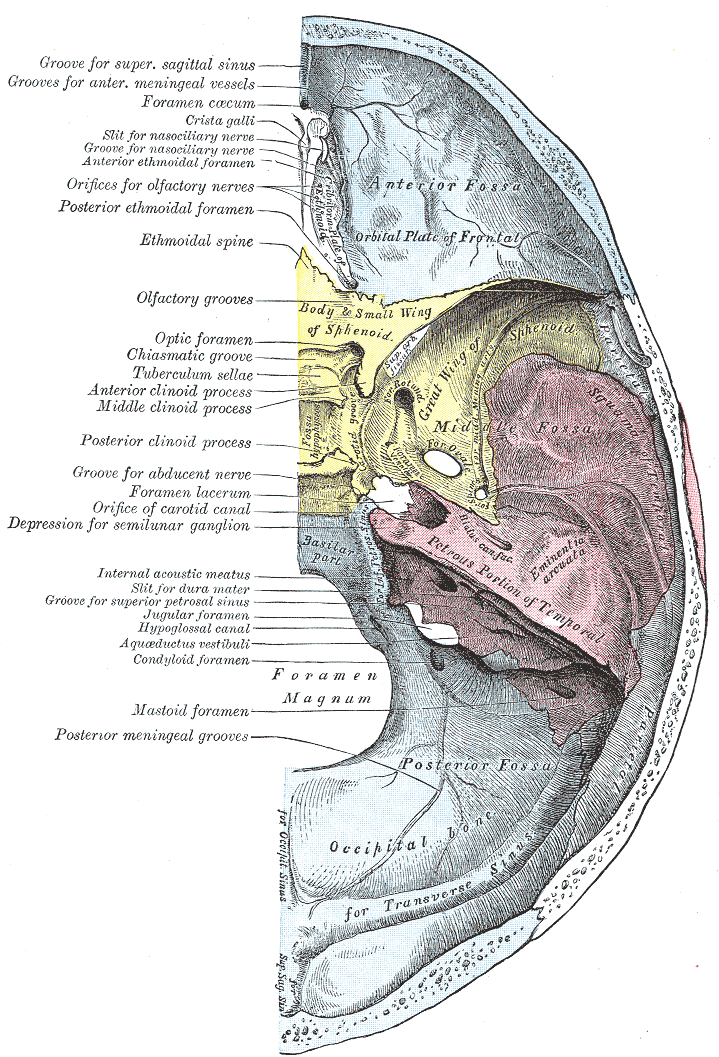
Base of the skull. Upper surface.
