= Falx cerebelli =

Skull anatomy

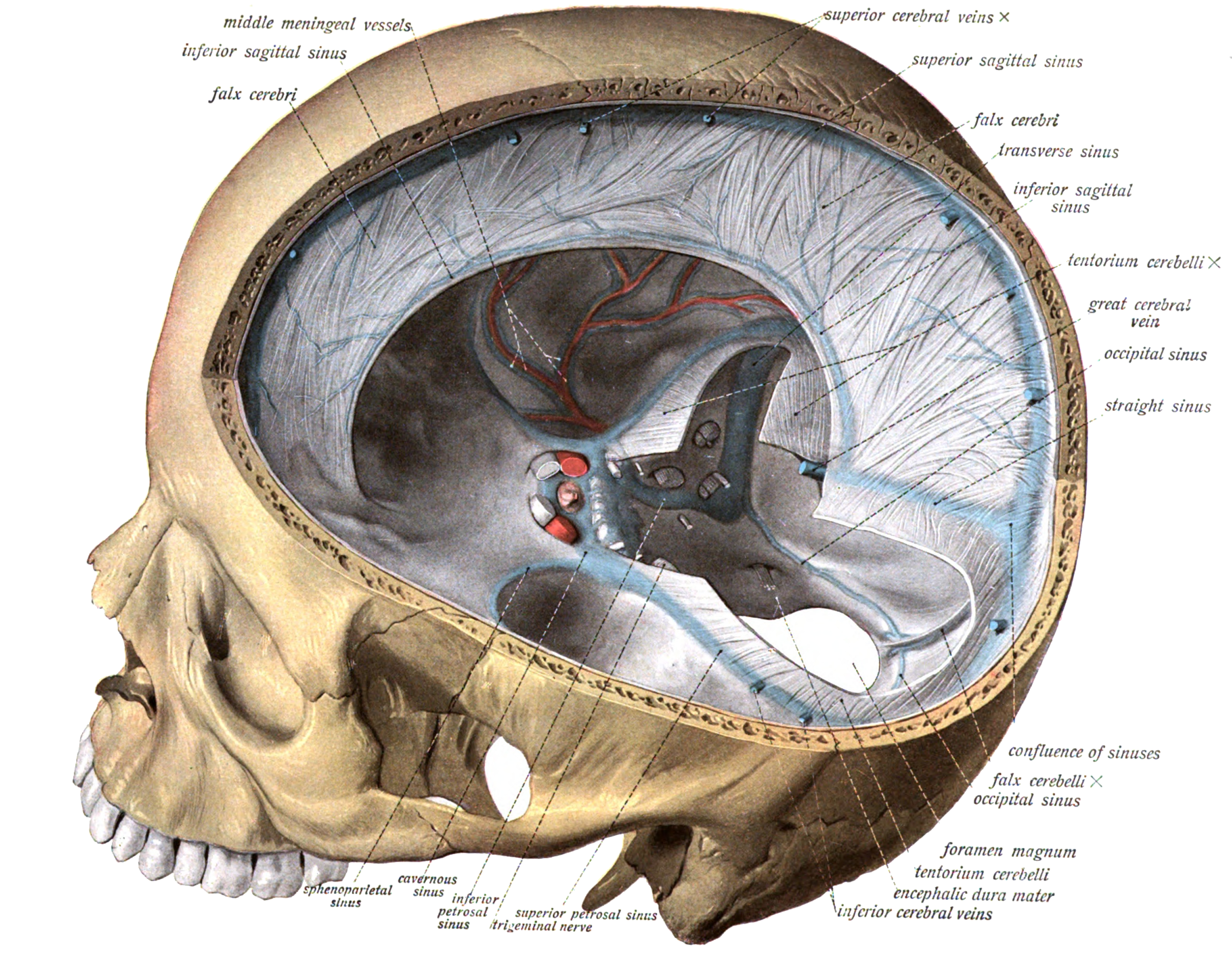
- Falx cerebelli seen in back portion of skull.

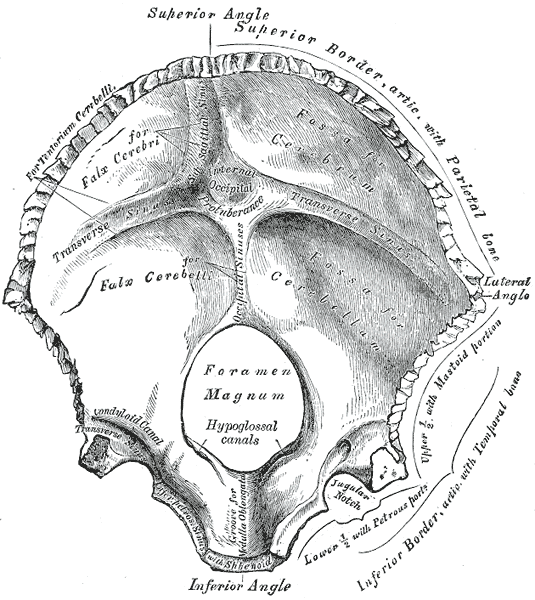
- Occipital bone. Inner surface. (Portions "for faulx cerebelli" identified at center left.)

Details
- Part of: Meninges

Identifiers
- Latin: falx cerebelli
- NeuroNames: 1238
- TA98: A14.1.01.106
- TA2: 5377
- FMA: 83974

The falx cerebelli is a small sickle-shaped fold of dura mater projecting forwards into the posterior cerebellar notch as well as projecting into the vallecula of the cerebellum between the two cerebellar hemispheres.

The name comes from two Latin words: falx, meaning "curved blade or scythe", and cerebellum, meaning "little brain".

== Anatomy ==
The falx cerebelli is a small midline fold of dura mater projecting anterior-ward from the skull and into the space between the cerebellar hemispheres. It generally measures between 2.8 and 4.5 cm in length, and approximately 1–2 mm in thickness.

=== Attachments ===
Superiorly, it (with its upwardly directed base) attaches at the midline to the posterior portion of the inferior surface of the tentorium cerebelli.

Posteriorly, it attaches to the internal occipital crest; the inferior-most extremity of its posterior attachment frequently divides into two small folds that terminate at either side of the foramen magnum.

=== Anatomical relations ===
The occipital sinus is contained within the posterior extremity of the falx cerebelli where it attaches to the internal occipital crest.

=== Anatomical variation ===
In its lower portion the falx cerebelli diminishes very rapidly in height and as it descends, it can divide into two smaller folds or diverging limbs, which are lost on the sides of the foramen magnum. Other variations such as duplication, triplication, absence, and fenestration are much less common. As dural venous sinuses are concurrent with the development of dural folds, duplication of the falx cerebelli is usually associated with duplicated occipital sinus. Knowledge of these variations is important in preventing iatrogenic injuries in this region.

== See also ==
- Falx (disambiguation) — other parts of the anatomy with names including "falx"
