= Sigmoid sinus =

Vein channel in the skull

Sigmoid Sinus
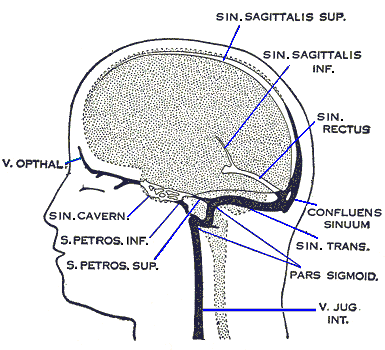
- Dural veins. ("Pars sigmoid" labeled at lower right.)

Details
- Source: Transverse sinus
- Drains to: Internal jugular vein

Identifiers
- Latin: sinus sigmoideus
- TA98: A12.3.05.108
- TA2: 4847
- FMA: 50782

The sigmoid sinuses (sigma- or s-shaped hollow curve), also known as the pars sigmoid, are paired dural venous sinuses within the skull that receive blood from posterior transverse sinuses.

== Structure ==
The sigmoid sinus is a dural venous sinus situated within the dura mater. The sigmoid sinus receives blood from the transverse sinuses, which track the posterior wall of the cranial cavity, travels inferiorly along the parietal bone, temporal bone and occipital bone, and converges with the inferior petrosal sinuses to form the internal jugular vein.

Each sigmoid sinus begins beneath the temporal bone and follows a tortuous course to the jugular foramen, at which point the sinus becomes continuous with the internal jugular vein.

== Function ==
The sigmoid sinus receives blood from the transverse sinuses, which receive blood from the posterior aspect of the skull. Along its course, the sigmoid sinus also receives blood from the cerebral veins, cerebellar veins, diploic veins, and emissary veins.
