= Cerebral hemisphere =

Left and right cerebral hemispheres of the brain

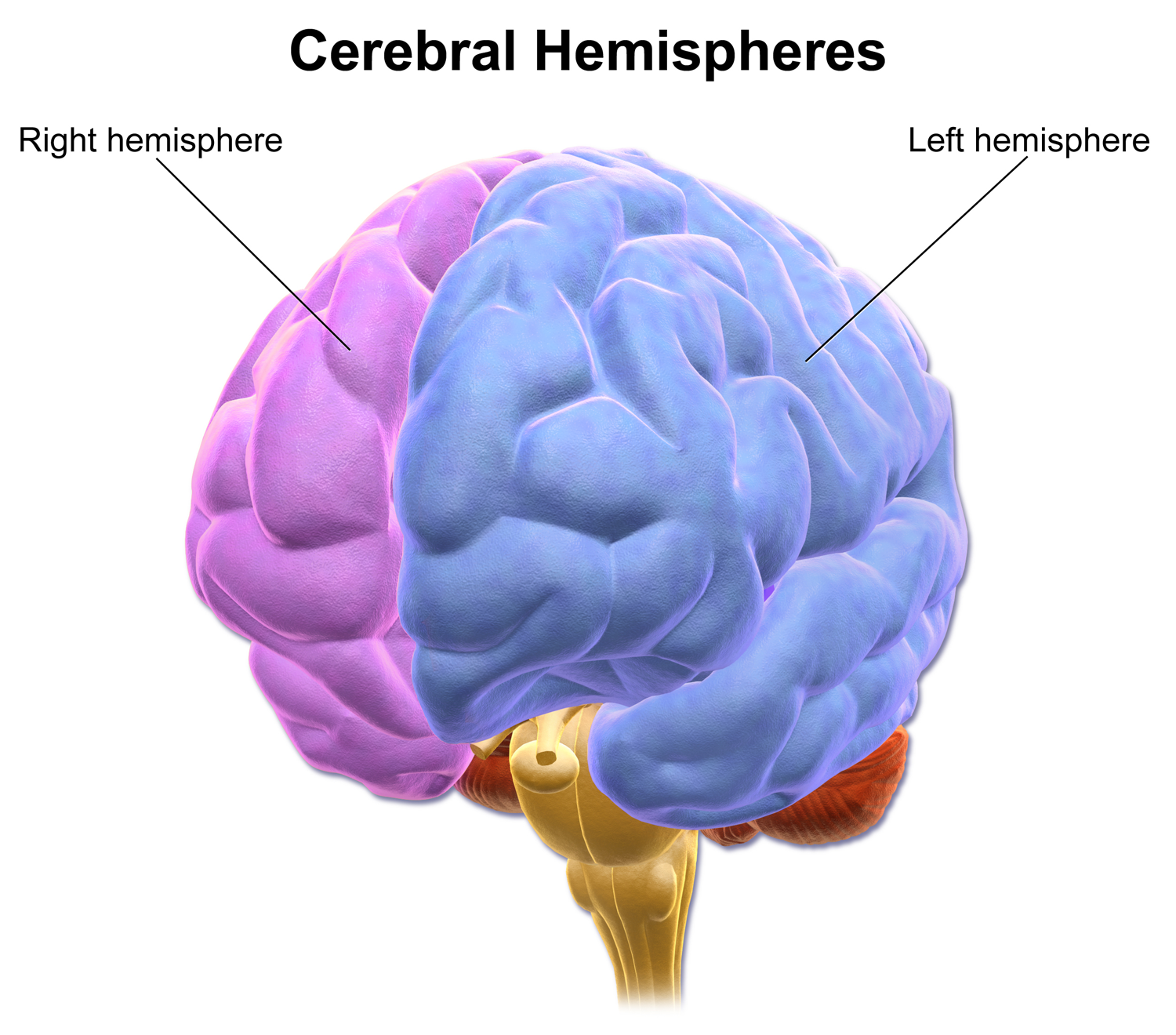
- Human brain seen from front

- Right cerebral hemisphere Left cerebral hemisphere

Details

Identifiers
- Latin: hemisphaerium cerebri
- NeuroNames: 241
- NeuroLex ID: birnlex_1796
- TA98: A14.1.09.002
- TA2: 5418
- FMA: 61817

The cerebrum, or the largest part of the vertebrate brain, is made up of two cerebral hemispheres. The deep groove known as the longitudinal fissure divides the cerebrum into the left and right hemispheres, but the hemispheres remain united by the corpus callosum, a large bundle of nerve fibers in the middle of the brain whose primary function is to integrate sensory and motor signals between the hemispheres. In eutherian (placental) mammals, other bundles of nerve fibers like the corpus callosum exist, including the anterior commissure, the posterior commissure, and the fornix, but compared with the corpus callosum, they are much smaller in size.

Broadly, the hemispheres are made up of two types of tissues. The thin outer layer of the cerebral hemispheres is made up of gray matter, composed of neuronal cell bodies, dendrites, and synapses; this outer layer constitutes the cerebral cortex (cortex is Latin for "bark of a tree"). Below that is the larger inner layer of white matter, composed of axons and myelin.

Each hemisphere is further subdivided into a frontal, parietal, occipital, and temporal lobe. The central sulcus is a prominent fissure that separates both the frontal lobe from the parietal lobe and the primary motor cortex from the primary somatosensory cortex. Three of the four lobes also have "poles": the occipital pole, the frontal pole, and the temporal pole.

The two cerebral hemispheres are approximately macroscopic mirror images of each other, with subtle anatomical differences between them, such as the Yakovlevian torque that is sometimes seen in the human brain. Nevertheless, on a microscopic level, the functions of cells, the quantities of neurotransmitters, and the types of receptors between the hemispheres are markedly asymmetrical. While some of these hemispheric distribution differences are consistent across human beings, or even across some species, many observable distribution differences vary from individual to individual within a given species.

== Structure ==
Each cerebral hemisphere has an outer layer of cerebral cortex composed of grey matter and in the interior of the cerebral hemispheres is an inner layer or core of white matter known as the centrum semiovale. The interior portion of the hemispheres of the cerebrum includes the lateral ventricles, the basal ganglia, and the white matter.

=== Poles ===
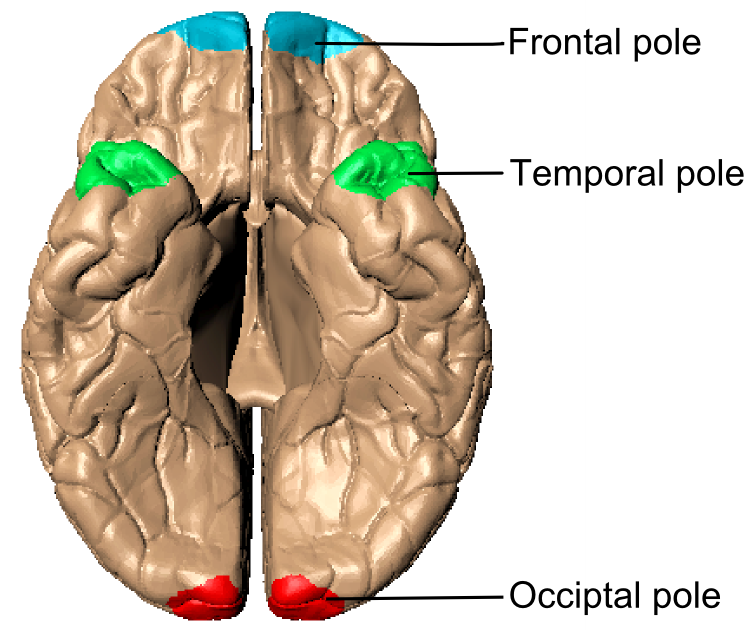
Poles of cerebral hemispheres

There are three poles of the cerebrum: the occipital pole, the frontal pole, and the temporal pole. The occipital pole is the posterior end of each occipital lobe in each hemisphere. It is more pointed than the rounder frontal pole. The frontal pole is at the frontmost part of the frontal lobe in each hemisphere, and is more rounded than the occipital pole. The temporal pole is located between the frontal and occipital poles, and sits in the anterior part of middle cranial fossa in each temporal lobe.

== Composition ==
If the upper part of either hemisphere is removed, at a level about 1.25 cm above the corpus callosum, the central white matter will be exposed as an oval-shaped area, the centrum semiovale, surrounded by a narrow convoluted margin of gray substance, and studded with numerous minute red dots (puncta vasculosa), produced by the escape of blood from divided blood vessels.

If the remaining portions of the hemispheres be slightly drawn apart a broad band of white substance, the corpus callosum, will be observed, connecting them at the bottom of the longitudinal fissure; the margins of the hemispheres which overlap the corpus callosum are called the labia cerebri.

Each labium is part of the cingulate gyrus already described; and the groove between it and the upper surface of the corpus callosum is termed the callosal sulcus.

If the hemispheres are sliced off to a level with the upper surface of the corpus callosum, the white substance of that structure will be seen connecting the two hemispheres.

The large expanse of medullary matter now exposed, surrounded by the convoluted margin of gray substance, is called the centrum semiovale. The blood supply to the centrum semiovale is from the superficial middle cerebral artery. The cortical branches of this artery descend to provide blood to the centrum semiovale.

=== Development ===
The cerebral hemispheres are derived from the telencephalon. They arise five weeks after conception as bilateral invaginations of the walls. The hemispheres grow round in a C-shape and then back again, pulling all structures internal to the hemispheres (such as the ventricles) with them. The intraventricular foramina (also called the foramina of Monro) allow communication with the lateral ventricles. The choroid plexus is formed from ependymal cells and vascular mesenchyme.

== Function ==
=== Hemisphere lateralization ===
Broad generalizations are often made in popular psychology about certain functions (e.g. logic, creativity) being lateralized, that is, located in the right or left side of the brain. These claims are often inaccurate, as most brain functions are actually distributed across both hemispheres. Most scientific evidence for asymmetry relates to low-level perceptual functions rather than the higher-level functions popularly discussed (e.g. subconscious processing of grammar, not "logical thinking" in general). In addition to this lateralization of some functions, the low-level representations also tend to represent the contralateral side of the body.

The best example of an established lateralization is that of Broca's and Wernicke's Areas (language) where both are often found exclusively on the left hemisphere. These areas frequently correspond to handedness however, meaning the localization of these areas is regularly found on the hemisphere opposite to the dominant hand. Function lateralization, such as semantics, intonation, accentuation, and prosody, has since been called into question and largely been found to have a neuronal basis in both hemispheres.

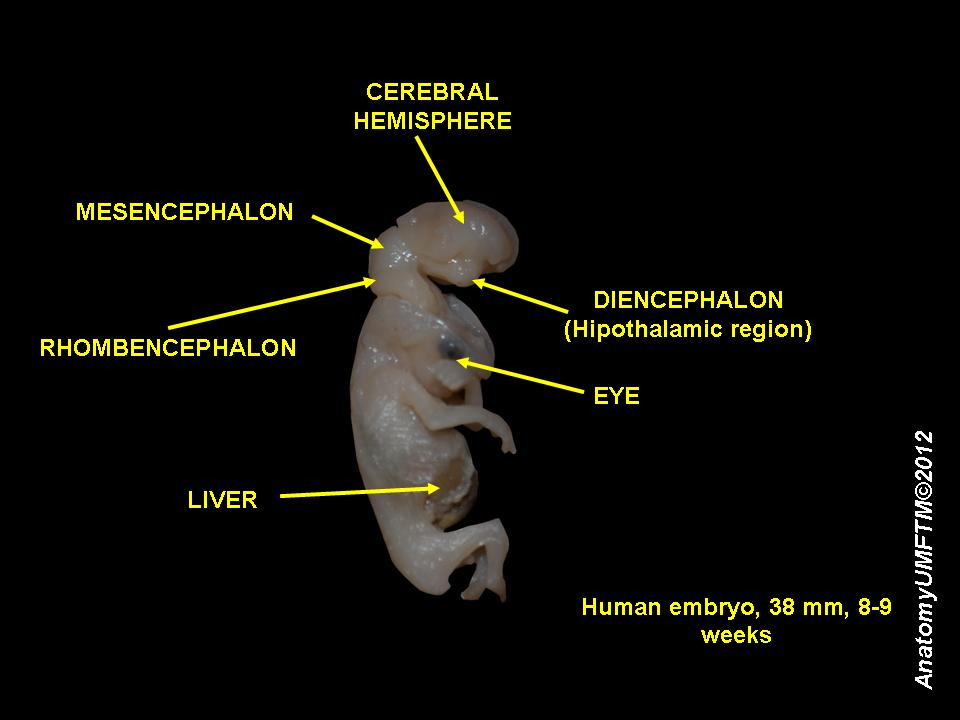
Cerebral hemispheres of a human embryo at 8 weeks

Perceptual information is processed in both hemispheres, but is laterally partitioned: information from each side of the body is sent to the opposite hemisphere (visual information is partitioned somewhat differently, but still lateralized). Similarly, motor control signals sent out to the body also come from the hemisphere on the opposite side. Thus, hand preference (which hand someone prefers to use) is also related to hemisphere lateralization.

In some aspects, the hemispheres are asymmetrical; the right side is slightly bigger. There are higher levels of the neurotransmitter norepinephrine on the right and higher levels of dopamine on the left. The right hemisphere is more sensitive to testosterone. There is more white matter (longer axons) on the right and more grey matter (cell bodies) on the left.

Linear reasoning functions of language such as grammar and word production are often lateralized to the left hemisphere of the brain. In contrast, holistic reasoning functions of language such as intonation and emphasis are often lateralized to the right hemisphere of the brain. Other integrative functions such as intuitive or heuristic arithmetic, binaural sound localization, etc. seem to be more bilaterally controlled.

== Clinical significance ==
Infarcts of the centrum ovale can occur.

As a treatment for epilepsy the corpus callosum may be severed to cut the major connection between the hemispheres in a procedure known as a corpus callosotomy.

A hemispherectomy is the removal or disabling of one of the hemispheres of the brain. This is a rare procedure used in some extreme cases of seizures which are unresponsive to other treatments.

== Additional images ==
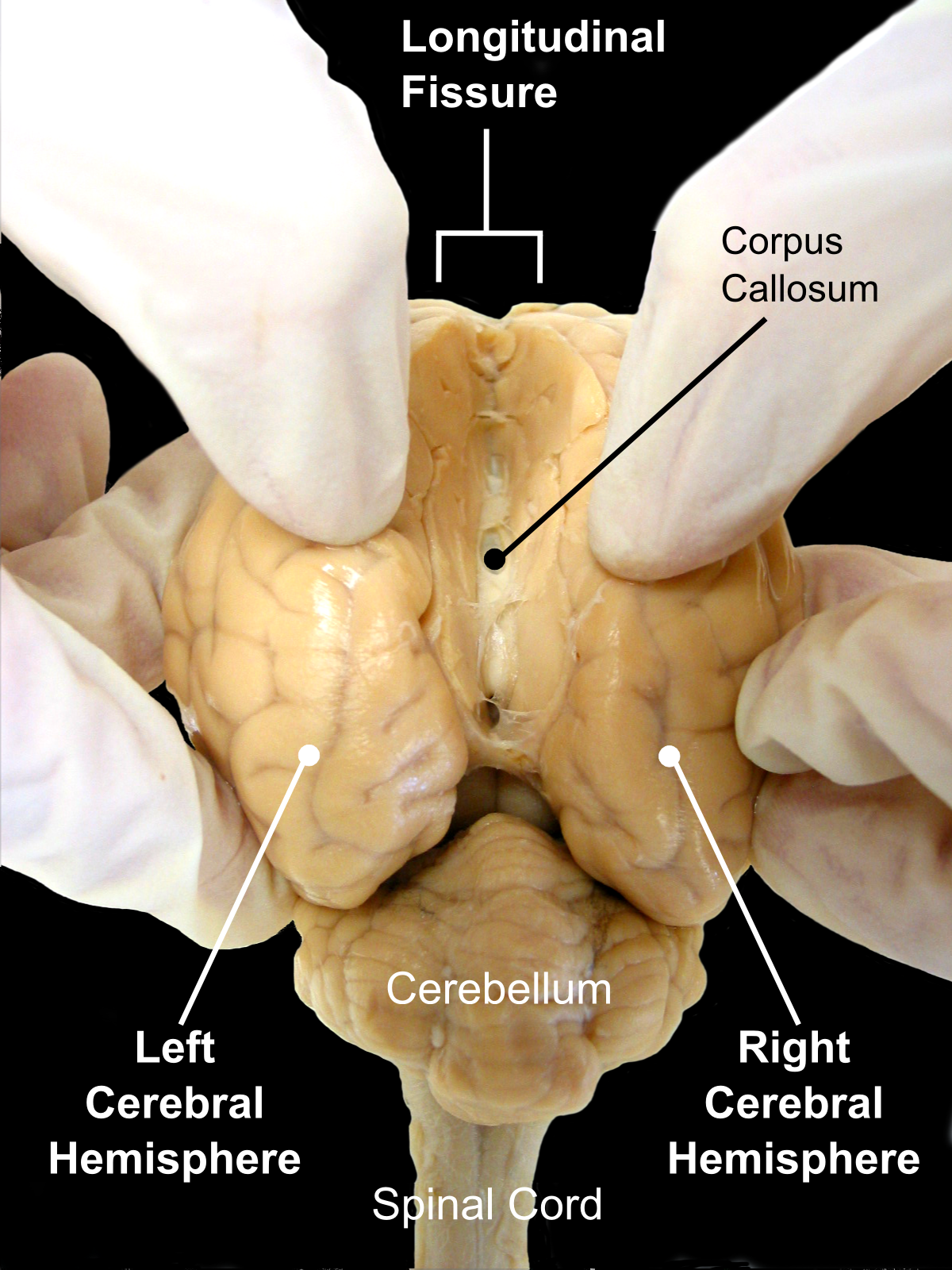
The sheep brain seen from the back. Opening longitudinal fissure which separates left and right cerebral hemispheres.

Lateral surface (The frontal pole is approximately at 10, the occipital pole is approximately at 17, and the temporal pole is approximately at 38.)
