= Cutaneous meningioma =

- Other names: Rudimentary meningocele, heterotopic meningeal tissue
- Specialty: Dermatology

Cutaneous meningioma, also known as heterotopic meningeal tissue, and rudimentary meningocele is a developmental defect, and results from the presence of meningocytes outside the calvarium.

== Signs and symptoms ==
Lesions appear as hard, subcutaneous lumps that might be pale or somewhat black in appearance. Alopecic lesions with overlaying hair tufts or even hypertrichosis have been reported. Although usually painless, some people have reported experiencing discomfort or tenderness.

== Causes ==
While type II and type III tumors form later in life, type I tumors are congenital.

== Diagnosis ==
Since imaging studies and clinical characteristics are frequently equivocal, cytology, and particularly histology, is essential for determining the final diagnosis. Meningothelial cells arranged in a whorled pattern with lobules, nests, and sheets of oval or polygonal cells are the most prevalent histopathological form. These cells display calcification foci (psammomma bodies) or hyaline structures (collagen bodies), which are highly useful diagnostic markers.

The clinical differential diagnosis is extensive and includes, among other conditions, alopecia areata, nevus sebaceous, cyst, glioma, fibroma, hemangioma, lipoma, scar, and verrucous hamartoma.

=== Classification ===
A commonly used categorization based on clinicopathological criteria was created by Lopetz et al. in 1974. They classified meningiomas of the skin into three categories:

1. Congenital type, these grow from ectopic arachnoid caught in the dermis and subcutaneous tissue, and they appear on the scalp and paravertebral region from birth. These might be primitive meningoceles that have broken off from the central nervous system. Usually, type I cutaneous meningioma only affects the subcutaneous tissue.
2. Ectopic soft tissue meningioma around the eyes, ears, nose, and mouth that spreads to the skin by contiguity. There are no known related meningiomas of neuraxis.
3. Adult cases of neuroaxis-related meningioma tumors that spread to the dermis and subcutaneous tissue are significantly more common. They could result from trauma, any other surgical cause, or a bone deformity.

== Treatment ==
Complete surgical excision is the basis of treatment.

== See also ==
- Meningioma
- List of cutaneous conditions
