= Archangelo Piccolomini =

Italian anatomist and physician

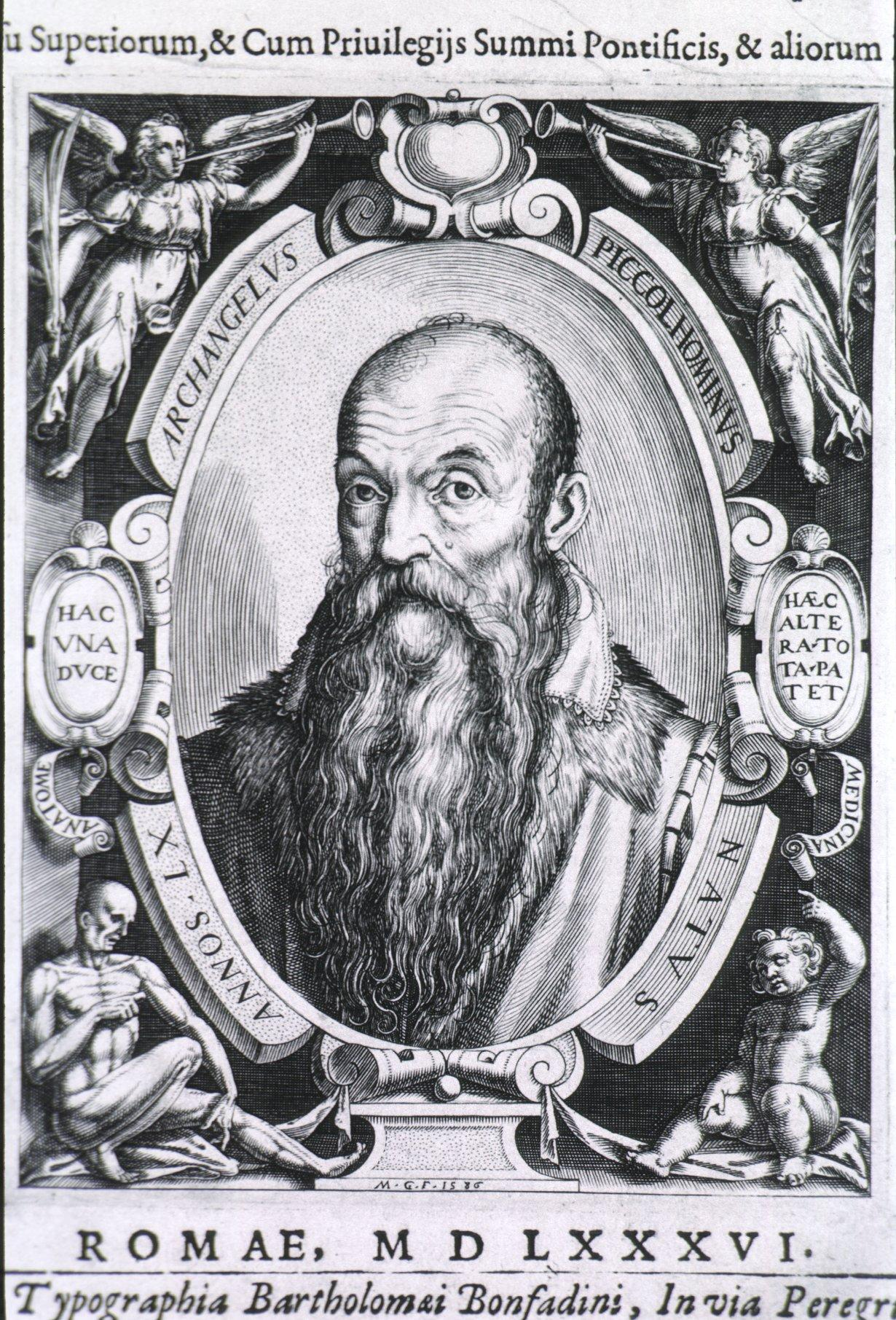
- Archangelo Piccolomini
- Born: 1525; Siena, Republic of Siena
- Died: October 19, 1586 (aged 60–61); Rome, Papal States
- Resting place: Santa Maria sopra Minerva
- Education: University of Ferrara
- Known for: Being the first to describe and differentiate the white matter of the cerebrum from the grey matter of the cortex
- Scientific career
- Fields: Medicine, anatomy
- Workplaces: University of Bordeaux; Sapienza University of Rome

Archangelo Piccolomini or Arcangelo Piccolomini (1525–1586) was an Italian anatomist and personal physician to a number of popes.

== Biography ==
Archangelo Piccolomini was born in Siena in 1525, and moved to Ferrara, where completed his studies in the field of medicine and philosophy. He went to France in 1550 where he was appointed to the Chair of Philosophy at the University of Bordeaux, and compiled a broad commentary on the treatise of Galen De Humoribus in 1556, dedicating it to the Bishop of Ceneda, Michele Della Torre and apostolic nuncio to Paris.

He was called to Rome by Pope Paul IV in 1557, and became the personal physician to the pope, a position he maintained under successive popes Pius IV and Gregory XIII. From 1575 he taught anatomy at the Sapienza.

In 1586 he published the anatomical treatise Anatomicae praelectiones explicantes mirificam corporis humani fabricam, which he dedicated to Pope Sixtus V, who had just taken office. He was the first to describe and differentiate the white matter of the cerebrum from the grey matter of the cortex. His observations led to the anatomical study of the cortex by Marcello Malphigi and Antonie van Leeuwenhoek.

He died later that year in Rome, and was buried in the church of Santa Maria sopra Minerva.
