= Flexure (embryology) =

Part of the embryonic neural tube

Flexures
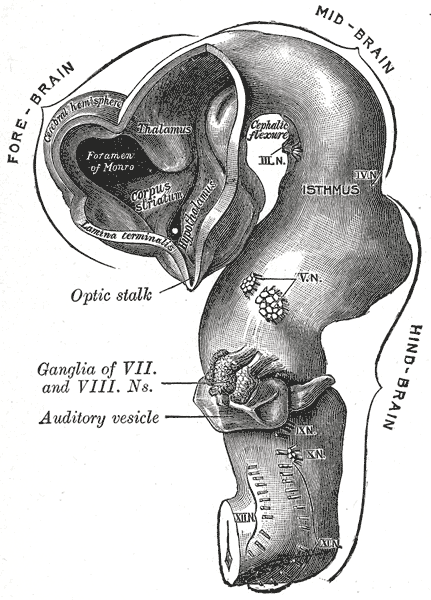
- Brain of human embryo of four and a half weeks, showing the three flexures

Details

Identifiers
- Latin: flexura
- TE: (embryology)_by_E5.14.3.3.0.0.3 E5.14.3.3.0.0.3

Three flexures form in the part of the embryonic neural tube that develops into the brain. At four weeks gestational age in the human embryo, the neural tube has developed at the cranial end into three swellings – the primary brain vesicles. The space into which the cranial part of the neural tube is developing is limited. This limitation causes the neural tube to bend, or flex, at two ventral flexures – the rostral cephalic flexure, and the caudal cervical flexure. It also bends dorsally into the pontine flexure. These flexures have formed by the time that the primary brain vesicles have developed into five secondary brain vesicles in the fifth week.

== Flexure development ==
The neural tube has a longitudinal axis called the neuraxis, from the future brain area at the cranial end, to the conus medullaris of the spinal cord at the caudal end. By the fourth week in the human embryo, at its cranial end, three swellings have formed as primary brain vesicles. These vesicles form the future forebrain, midbrain, and hindbrain. The three vesicles need to develop further into five brain vesicles but the space at the cranial end is limited. This causes the neural tube to bend ventrally at two flexures – the first at the cephalic flexure and the second at the cervical flexure. A third flexure is oriented in the opposite dorsal direction as the pontine flexure. By the fifth week further flexion has taken place and the five secondary brain vesicles have formed.

The angle formed by the two ventral flexures, the cephalic flexure and the cervical flexure together, is a right angle in the ventral direction between the axis of the body and the axis of the brain. The pontine flexure is located between these two flexures.

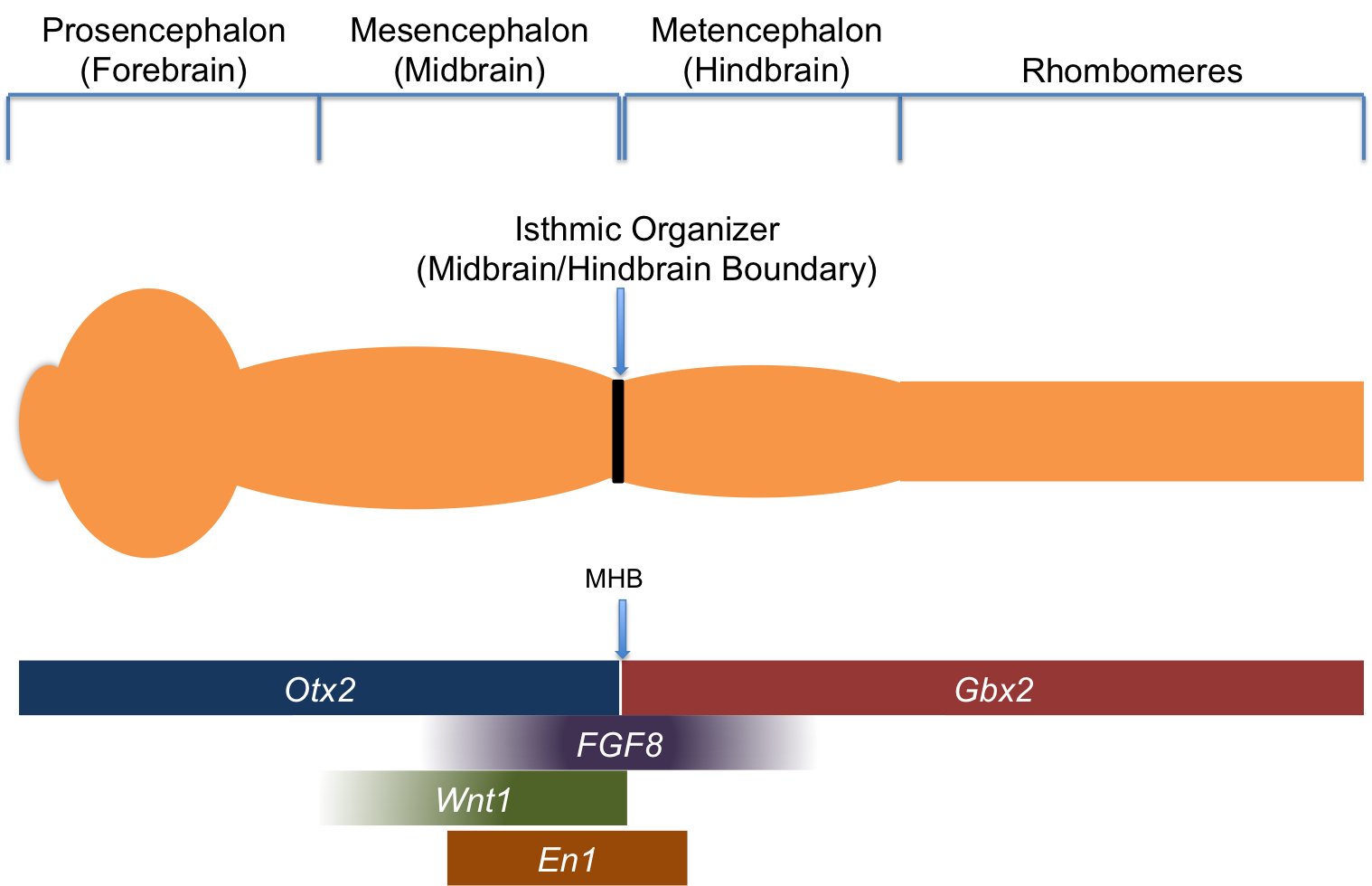
Isthmic organizer at the midbrain-hindbrain boundary.

=== Cephalic flexure ===
The cephalic flexure, also known as the mesencephalic flexure, is the first flexure or bend, that forms in the region of midbrain. The caudal part of the midbrain and the rostral part of the hindbrain makes up a midbrain-hindbrain boundary region known as the isthmic organizer. In human embryos, it generally occurs at the end of the 3rd week or the beginning of the 4th.

=== Cervical flexure ===
The cervical flexure forms between the hindbrain and the spinal cord.

=== Pontine flexure ===
The pontine flexure, also called the rhombic flexure, forms the boundary between the metencephalon and the myelencephalon. The metencephalon becomes the pons and the cerebellum, and the myelencephalon becomes the medulla oblongata. These two regions develop and fold dorsally at the pontine flexure.
