= Neuraxis =

Axis of the central nervous system

- The mammalian nervous system is arranged with the neural tube running along an anterior to posterior axis, from nose to tail for a four-legged animal like a dog. Humans, as two-legged animals, have a bend in the neuraxis between the brain stem and the diencephalon, along with a bend in the neck, so that the eyes and the face are oriented forward.

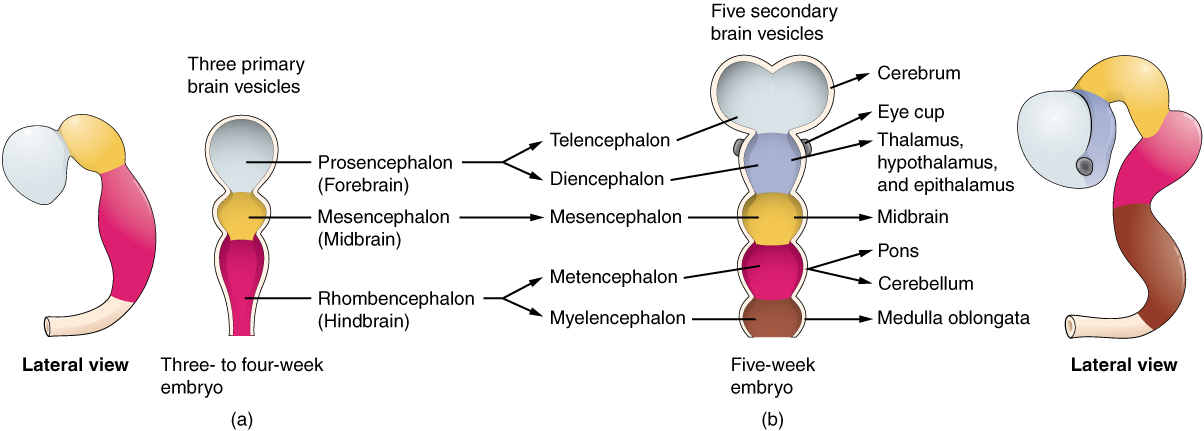
- The embryonic brain develops complexity through enlargements of the neural tube called vesicles; (a) The primary vesicle stage has three regions, and (b) the secondary vesicle stage has five regions.

The neuraxis, also known as the neuroaxis is the axis of the central nervous system. It extends from the brain to the spinal cord and denotes the direction in which the central nervous system lies in both development and in mature organisms. Early on in embryological development, the neuraxis begins as a distinctly straight axis, but quickly develops bends by various flexures, most notably the cephalic flexure, which contributes most to the complex mature structure of the spinal cord and brain.

Embryonic development can help in understanding how complex structures form around the neuraxis. The embryonic nervous system in vertebrates is highly conserved, meaning its structure and function have stayed the same across species, and generally appear the same. During development, the formation of the neural tube-and later the brain and spinal cord- define the layout of the neuraxis. This establishes the anterior-posterior dimension of the nervous system. The anterior-posterior dimension of the neuraxis overlays the superior-inferior dimension of the body. Depending on the formation of more differentiated structures, this axis may lose its rigid nature, adopting the curvature introduced by encephalic structures. For example, there is a major curve between the brain stem and forebrain, which is called the cephalic flexure. Because of this, the neuraxis starts in an inferior position—the end of the spinal cord—and ends in an anterior position, the front of the cerebrum. This can be illustrated when looking at a four-legged animal standing up on two legs. Without this flexure in the brain stem and at the top of the neck, a bipedal animal would be unable to look directly in front of them.

== Anatomical and clinical significance ==
The neuraxis holds a highly relevant role in anatomical and clinical settings. As a key feature of anatomical orientation, it provides a strong framework for identifying other structures, determining directionality, and applying these aspects towards clinical practice. In humans, neuraxis formation is marked by the emergence of a curved axis, increasing the complexity of neurological features. This added axis defies typical anatomical terminology, necessitating adapted terms to accurately describe new features. Once accurately established, the neuraxis provides a reference point to allow clinicians and researchers to accurately make diagnoses, conceptualize brain structures, and enables educators to explain spatial relationships between other parts of the body.

=== Anatomical orientation and origin of the neuraxis ===
The skull uses different anatomical terminology due to its embryonic origin of the neuraxis.

The neuraxis holds great importance anatomically, establishing the localization of the central nervous system. Through development, it establishes the anterior-posterior axis through which other anatomical terms can be applied in different CNS regions. Early on in embryogenesis, during gastrulation, the beginnings of the neuraxis become defined. Here the primitive streak is formed, a precursor the neural tube. The primitive streak marks the beginning of gastrulation and is a transient feature that exists primarily in vertebrates.Following the neural tube formation, a defined axis can be established and an initial neuraxis is formed. The originally straight axis adopts a curve as the brain enlarges, allowing for the formation and distinction of complex structures such as the brain stem and cerebral cortex. The terminology of these structures remains the same after development is complete. Dorsal refers to the back of the body as well as the top of the head, while ventral denotes the front of the body and the region under the neuraxis, the bottom of the head.

=== Clinical applications of the neuraxis ===
The neuraxis provides an importance reference for clinicians, particularly in the fields of neurology, neurosurgery, and radiology. Due to the curved nature of the human neuraxis, common anatomical terms such as rostral, caudal, dorsal, and ventral hold different meanings at the head, underscoring the importance of the neuraxis as a reference point. In radiology, interpretations of the neuraxis allows for accurate image interpretations for cross-sectional imaging and MRIs. Neurosurgery also heavily relies on a strong understanding of the neuraxis, particularly for entry-point localization and risk assessments. Atypical alignment of the neuraxis has been documented as a sign of underlying disease. Insufficient mechanical support and altered vasculature due to misaligned neuraxes causes extreme pathology in several conditions such as scoliosis, Arnold-Chiari malformation, and even some cases of Ehlers-Danlos Syndromes (EDS). This pathology is often marked by a disproportionate degree of neurological dysfunction. Extreme conditions of androgen insensitivity syndrome (AIS) can also lead to neuraxis deviation, increasing the chance of further pathogenesis. The neuraxis also plays a relevant role in rehabilitation and treatment, underscoring the importance of its anatomical role.

== See also ==
- Embryology
- Neural tube
- Pontine flexure
- Rostrum (anatomy)
