= Niccolò Massa =

Italian anatomist

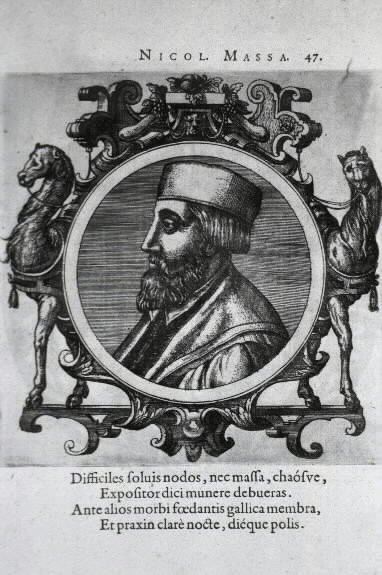
Nicolò Massa Portrait

Niccolò Massa (Italian: [nikkoˈlɔ mˈmassa]; 1485–1569) was an Italian anatomist who wrote an early anatomy text Anatomiae Libri Introductorius in 1536. In 1536 he described the cerebrospinal fluid.

Massa graduated from the Venetian College of Physicians with a degree in surgery in 1515 and then with a degree in medicine in 1521. He lived and practice medicine in Venice his entire life and was one of the most widely respected physicians of the early sixteenth century. IN 1524 he was appointed physician to the Scuola di S. Giorgio, and the nunnery of the Sepulchre. Massa taught, examined candidates and served as Consigliere for the Venetian College of Surgeons as well.

Massa was the author of several works beginning with a book on the French Disease which is commonly equated to modern day syphilis in 1524, Liber morbo gallico which went through several editions. This was followed by a book on anatomy, Anatomiae Libri Introductorius, a book on fevers, the Liber de febre pestilentiali, a work in Italian, the La loica, divisa in sette libri, and a collection of his letters, Epistolae medicinales Printed collections of letters from physicians was a popular genre in the sixteenth century. The letter tended to be written diagnosis and treatment advice, but they touched on a variety of topics. Massa mentioned important topics and figures of his day, including offering his opinion of Andreas Vesalius's Fabrica. Massa wrote two more books, Raggionamento ... sopra le infermitia che vengono dall'aere pestilentiale del presente anno MDL and Diligens examen de venaesectione in febribus ex humorum putredine ortis, the last published just a year before he died.

Massa was a regular dissector of bodies and performed dissections both to study anatomy and to understand the causes of diseases like Syphilis. He was respected enough to have several books dedicated to him. Like many well-known physicians of his day he is less well-known today because his name is not associated with the discovery of any modern medical fact.

== Family life ==
Massa was the child of Apollonio Massa and Franceschina Danese. His parents had six sons and three daughters including himself. In 1505, as Massa was still a child, his father died from an unknown cause. This was followed by the death of his five brothers all before the year 1530, with the last of them, Antonio Massa, passing in 1529. Through this, Massa found himself the provider of the house early in his career. Sadly, the unfortunate circumstances of his family did not just apply to his brothers, as one of his three sisters was an invalid from childhood. She lived with Massa as he was her sole provider and caretaker. His two other sisters lived relatively normal lives, and both married, with Massa providing the dowry for both. Massa had two sons, a daughter, and a nephew of which he took care. Once his career picked up, Massa found himself living a comfortable life. He was known to be very proud of his accomplishments as a "self-made man." In 1548 he married his daughter off to a Venetian family. Not but two years later did his daughters husband die. Once again Massa was supporting his daughter and his new grandson. Despite many family troubles, Massa pursued and thrived in the field of medicine.

== His early work on syphilis ==
Niccolò Massa's first publication, Liber de morbo gallico, discussed his work on the disease syphilis. He believed that syphilis was a new disease that arose in Italy during the period of time around the Siege of Naples in 1494. Syphilis, in his belief, was a sexually transmitted disease primarily. The most common way to contract the disease was through sexual intercourse with an infected woman. However, he did also believe that the disease could be spread through non-sexual contact and in rare cases spontaneously within the body. The symptoms he describes were hard ulcers on the genitalia of the infected and in some cases including fever, pain in one's extremities, swelling of the groin, hair loss, and varying manifestations on the skin. Finally, in extreme cases the disease was seen to affect the nervous system of the infected. He studied the disease in traditional humoral terms. He believed the symptoms were caused by cold and dry phlegm within the liver.

== Fevers ==
Niccolò Massa's book, Liber de febre pestilentiali, came at a very important time as Italy was facing in epidemic in the year 1555. The epidemic that was ravaging Italy at this time was the Bubonic Plague. Niccolò Massa was called into question whether the sickness in Venice was actually the Bubonic Plague. Upon examining the sickness in a Galenic nature he determined that because the sickness was affecting all people with no exceptions to age, sex, or occupation that it must be through the air. This connection came from the Hippocratic belief the elements in the human body. The one element common to all is air and Massa concluded that it was responsible. This disease, in Massa's eyes, was caused by an occurrence of warm and damp weather of which corrupted the air. He determined that this disease was spread by the sick through the air and taken in by breathing this corrupted air. Massa advised that isolation as well as deep sanitation of the city was necessary to halter the spread of this disease. Massa continued his work on pestilent fevers throughout his career.

== Cerebrospinal fluid ==
Massa is credited with being the first physician to discover intraventricular fluid intracranially during an autopsy. Massa reported these findings in his book Liber Introductorius Anatomiae. In his book he described finding a large amount of fluid between cerebral ventricles. This fluid is known now to be cerebrospinal fluid. This major discovery is considered an important milestone in the history of medicine.

== Sources ==
- Introduction to Northwestern University translation of book one of Andreas Vesalius' De Humani Corporis Fabrica, 2003.
- Introduction by Vivian Nutton. Free full text of first book.
- Richard Plamer, "Niccolò Massa, His Family and His Fortune", Medical History (1981) 25, 285-410.
