= Squamous part of occipital bone =

Skull bone

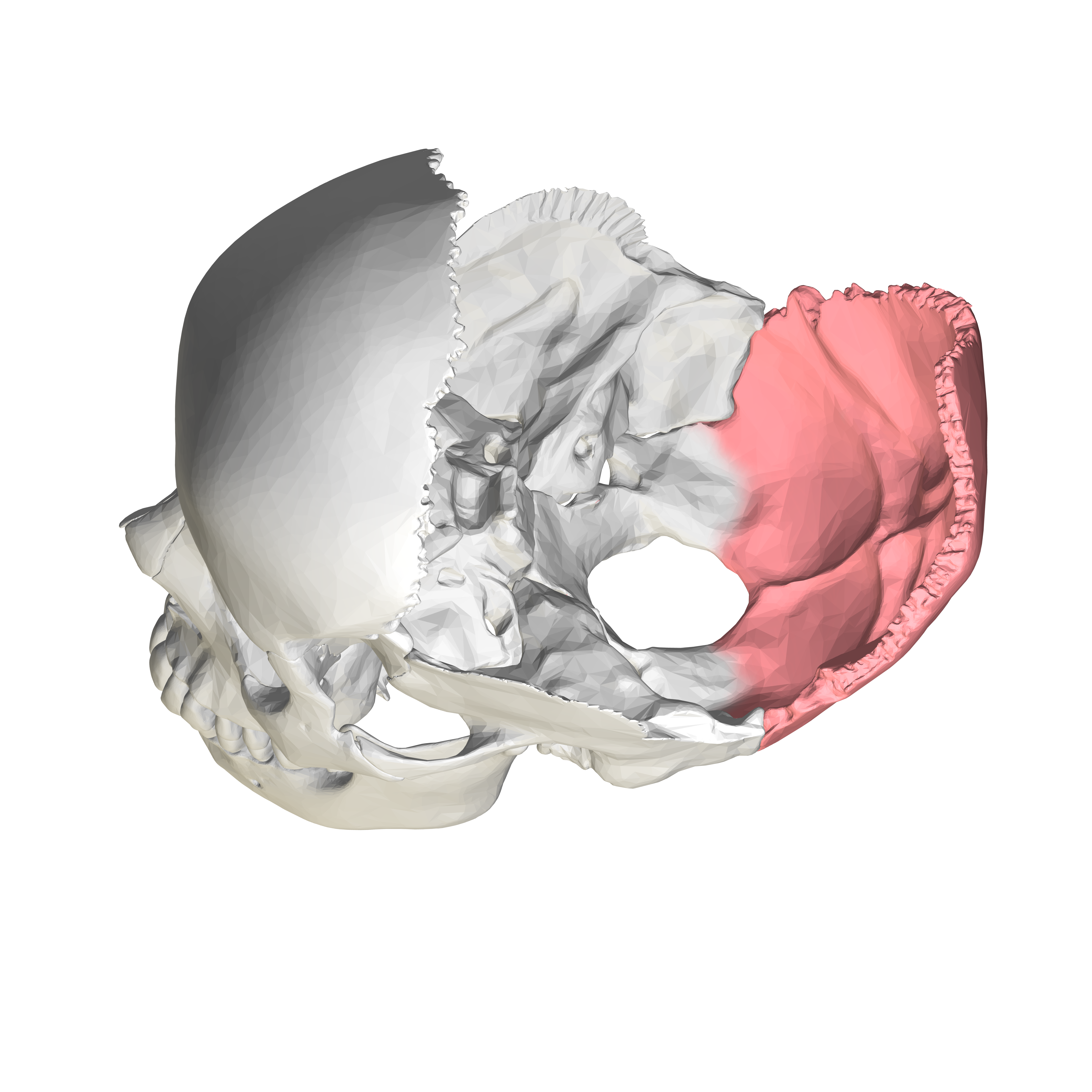
- Human skull seen from above (parietal bones removed). Squamous part is shown in red.

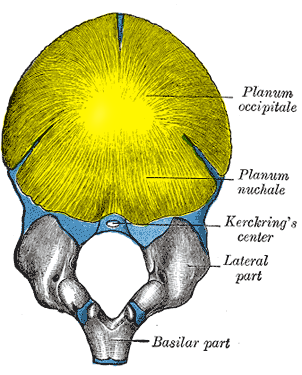
- Occipital bone at birth, seen from below. (Squamous part is top half, portion above foramen magnum, shown in yellow.)

Details

Identifiers
- Latin: squama occipitalis
- TA98: A02.1.04.010
- TA2: 565
- FMA: 52860

The squamous part of occipital bone is situated above and behind the foramen magnum, and is curved from above downward and from side to side.

== External surface ==
The external surface is convex and presents midway between the summit of the bone and the foramen magnum a prominence, the external occipital protuberance and inion.

Extending lateralward from this on either side are two curved lines, one a little above the other. The upper, often faintly marked, is named the highest nuchal line, and to it the epicranial aponeurosis is attached.

The lower is termed the superior nuchal line. That area of the squamous part, which lies above the highest nuchal lines is named the occipital plane (planum occipitale) and is covered by the occipitalis muscle. That below, termed the nuchal plane, is rough and irregular for the attachment of several muscles.

From the external occipital protuberance, an often faintly marked ridge or crest, the median nuchal line, descends to the foramen magnum and affords attachment to the nuchal ligament. Running from the middle of this line across either half of the nuchal plane is the inferior nuchal line.

Several muscles are attached to the outer surface of the squamous part, thus the superior nuchal line gives origin to the occipitalis and trapezius muscles, and insertion to the sternocleidomastoid and splenius capitis muscles. Into the surface between the superior and inferior nuchal lines the semispinalis capitis and the obliquus capitis superior are inserted, while the inferior nuchal line and the area below it receive the insertions of the rectus capitis posterior major and minor.

The posterior atlantooccipital membrane is attached around the postero-lateral part of the foramen magnum, just outside the margin of the foramen.

== Internal surface ==
The internal surface is deeply concave and divided into four fossae by the cruciform eminence.

The upper two fossae are triangular and lodge the occipital lobes of the cerebrum; the lower two are quadrilateral and accommodate the hemispheres of the cerebellum.

At the point of intersection of the four divisions of the cruciform eminence is the internal occipital protuberance.

From this protuberance the upper division of the cruciform eminence runs to the superior angle of the bone, and on one side of it (generally the right) is a deep groove, the sagittal sulcus, which lodges the hinder part of the superior sagittal sinus. To the margins of this sulcus the falx cerebri is attached.

The lower division of the cruciform eminence is prominent and is named the internal occipital crest; it bifurcates near the foramen magnum and gives attachment to the falx cerebelli. In the attached margin of this falx is the occipital sinus, which is sometimes duplicated.

In the upper part of the internal occipital crest, a small depression is sometimes distinguishable; it is termed the vermian fossa since it is occupied by part of the vermis of the cerebellum. Transverse grooves, one on either side, extend from the internal occipital protuberance to the lateral angles of the bone; those grooves accommodate the transverse sinuses, and their prominent margins give attachment to the tentorium cerebelli.

The groove on the right side is usually larger than that on the left and is continuous with that for the superior sagittal sinus.

Exceptions to this condition are, however, not infrequent: the left may be larger than the right or the two may be almost equal in size.

The angle of union of the superior sagittal and transverse sinuses is named the confluence of the sinuses, and its position is indicated by a depression situated on one or other side of the protuberance.

== Additional images ==
Human skull seen from below. Squamous part is shown red.

Occipital bone, inner surface. Squamous part is shown red.

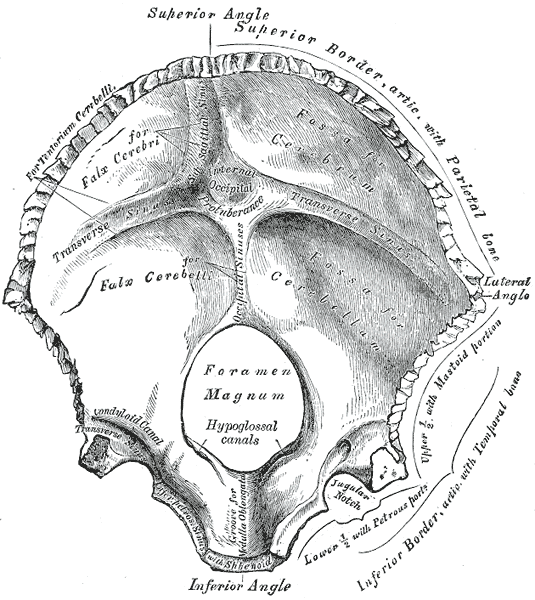
Occipital bone, inner surface. (Squamous part is top half, portion above foramen magnum.)
