= Occipital protuberance =

Occipital protuberance can refer to:

- Internal occipital protuberance
- External occipital protuberance
