= Posterior cranial fossa =

Area of the cranium containing the brainstem and cerebellum

- Superior view of the skull base. posterior cranial fossa shown in green. 1: Dorsum sellae of the sphenoid bone 2: Superior borders of the petrous part of the temporal bone 3: Groove for transverse sinus of the occipital bone

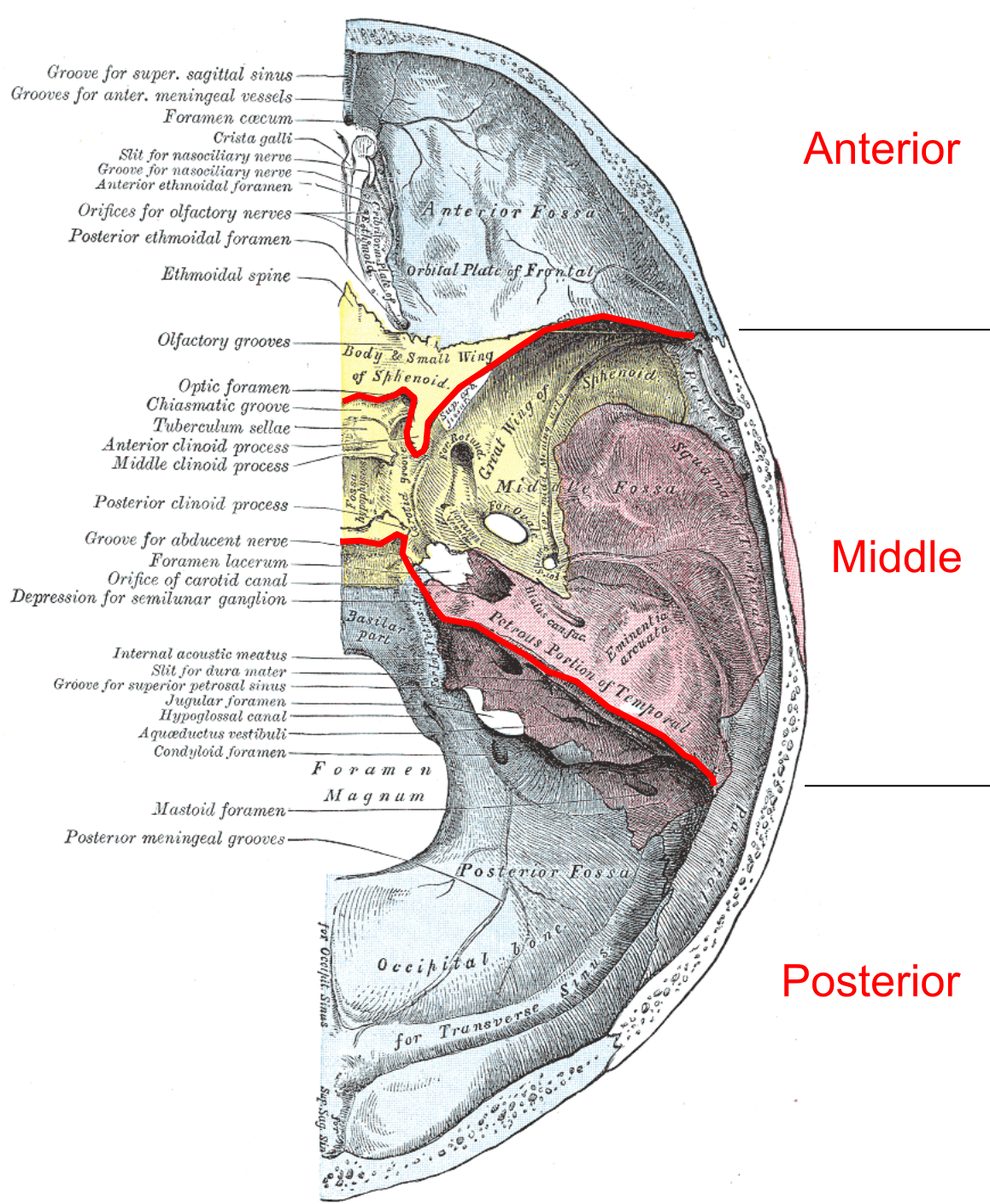
- Base of the skull. Upper surface. The Posterior cranial fossa is colored in blue, yellow, and red.

Details

Identifiers
- Latin: fossa cranii posterior
- MeSH: D003388
- TA98: A02.1.00.050
- TA2: 453
- FMA: 54368

The posterior cranial fossa is the part of the cranial cavity located between the foramen magnum, and tentorium cerebelli. It is formed by the sphenoid bones, temporal bones, and occipital bone. It lodges the cerebellum, and parts of the brainstem.

== Anatomy ==
The posterior cranial fossa is formed by the sphenoid bones, temporal bones, and occipital bone. It is the most inferior of the fossae. It houses the cerebellum, medulla oblongata, and pons.

=== Boundaries ===
Anteriorly, the posterior cranial fossa is bounded by the dorsum sellae, posterior aspect of the body of sphenoid bone, and the basilar part of occipital bone/clivus.

Laterally, it is bounded by the petrous parts and mastoid parts of the temporal bones, and the lateral parts of occipital bone.

Posteriorly, it is bounded by the squamous part of occipital bone.

=== Features ===
==== Foramen magnum ====
The foramen magnum is a large opening of the floor of the posterior cranial fossa, its most conspicuous feature.

==== Internal acoustic meatus ====
Lies in the anterior wall of the posterior cranial fossa. It transmits the facial (VII) and vestibulocochlear (VIII) cranial nerves into a canal in the petrous temporal bone.

==== Jugular foramen ====
Lies between the inferior edge of the petrous temporal bone and the adjacent occipital bone and transmits the internal jugular vein (actually begins here), the glossopharyngeal nerve (CN IX), vagus nerve (CN X), and accessory nerve (CN XI).

==== Hypoglossal canal ====
Lies at the anterolateral margins of the foramen magnum and transmits the hypoglossal nerve (CN XII).

=== Other ===
Also visible in the posterior cranial fossa are depressions caused by the venous sinuses returning blood from the brain to the venous circulation: Right and left transverse sinuses which meet at the confluence of sinuses (marked by the internal occipital protuberance).

The transverse sinuses pass horizontally from the most posterior point of the occiput.

Where the apex of the petrous temporal meets the squamous temporal, the transverse sinuses lead into sigmoid (S-shaped) sinuses (one on each side).

These pass along the articulation between the posterior edge of the petrous temporal bone and the anterior edge of the occipital bones to the jugular foramen, where the sigmoid sinus becomes the internal jugular vein.

Note that a superior petrosal sinus enters the junction of the transverse and sigmoid sinuses. Also an inferior petrosal sinus enters the sigmoid sinus near the jugular foramen.

The posterior cranial fossa is formed in the endocranium, and holds the most basal parts of the brain.

== Clinical significance ==
An underdeveloped posterior cranial fossa can cause Arnold–Chiari malformation. These can be either acquired or congenital disorders.

== Additional images ==
Animation

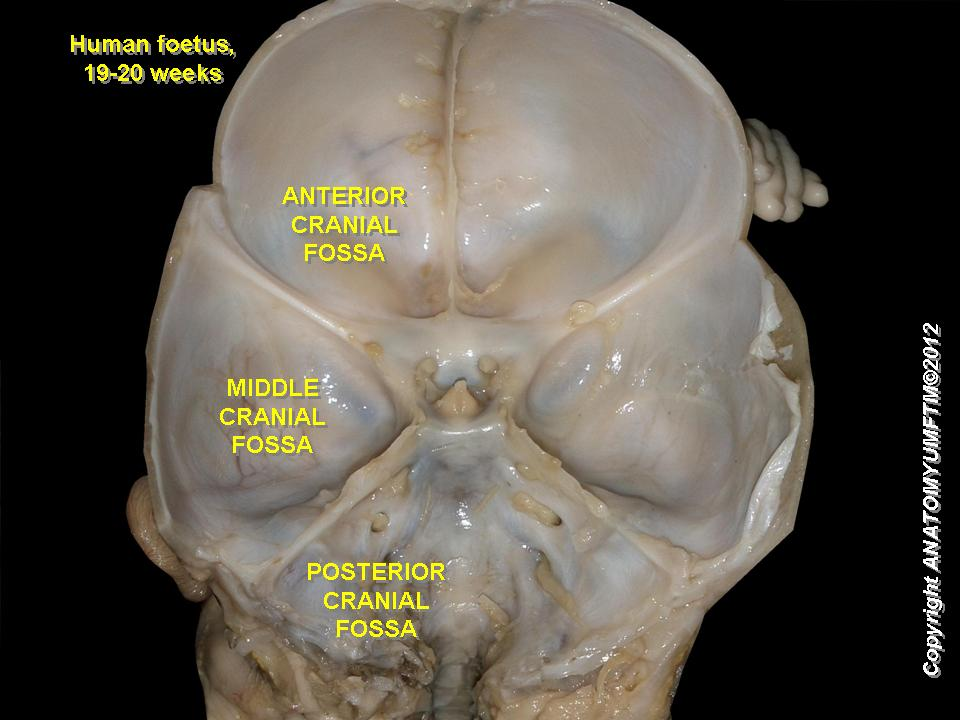
Posterior cranial fossa at human fetus

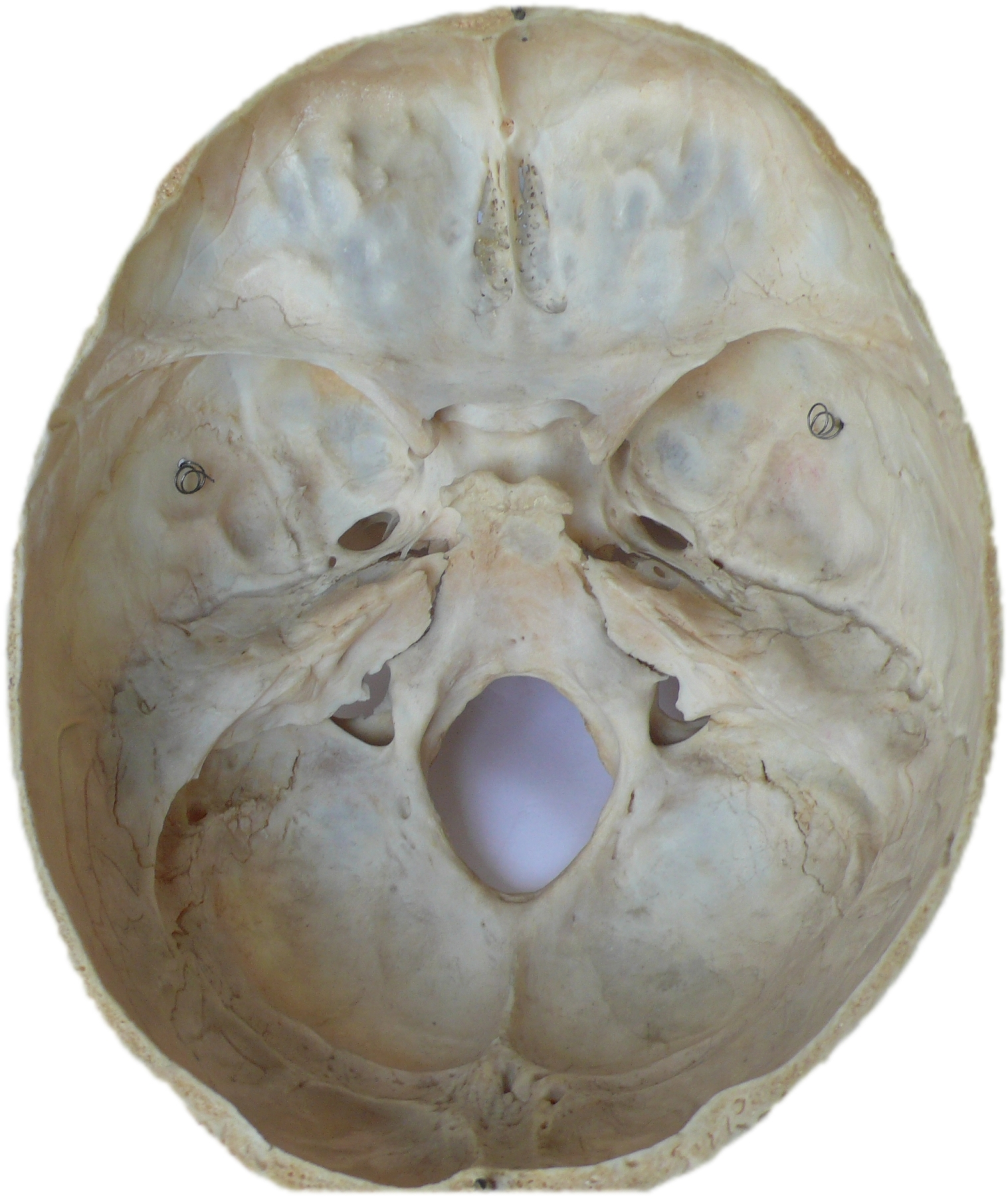
Base of skull

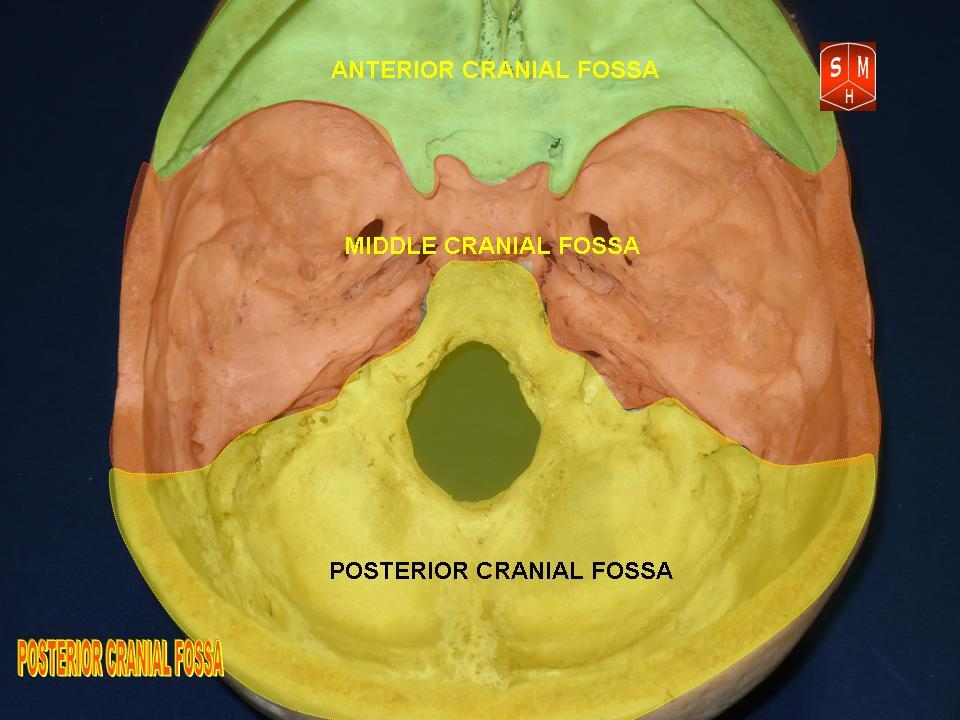
Posterior cranial fossa

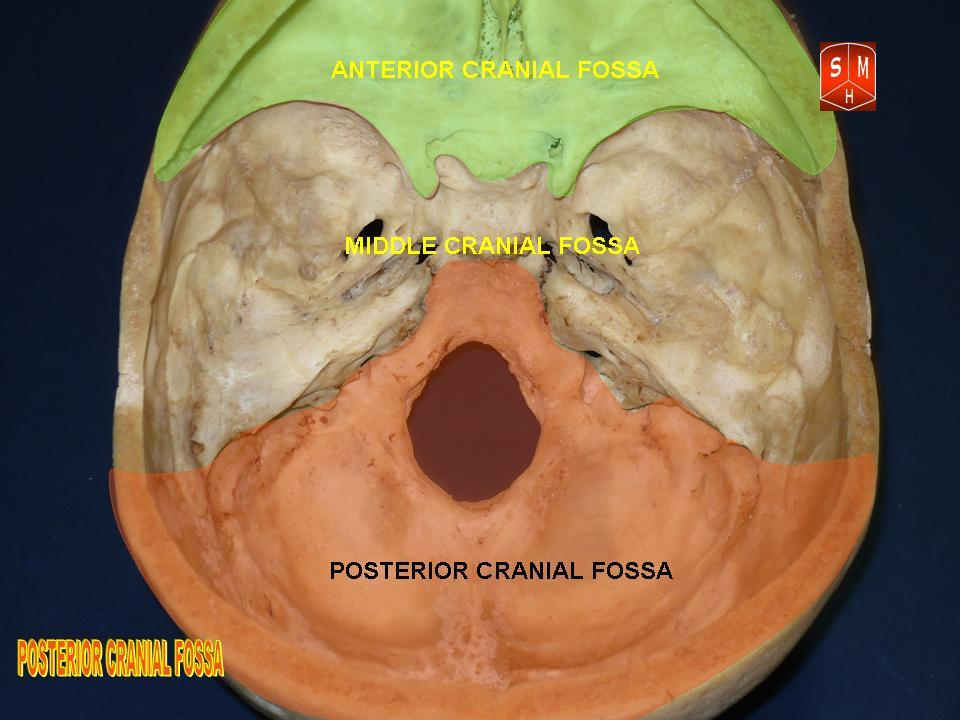
Posterior cranial fossa

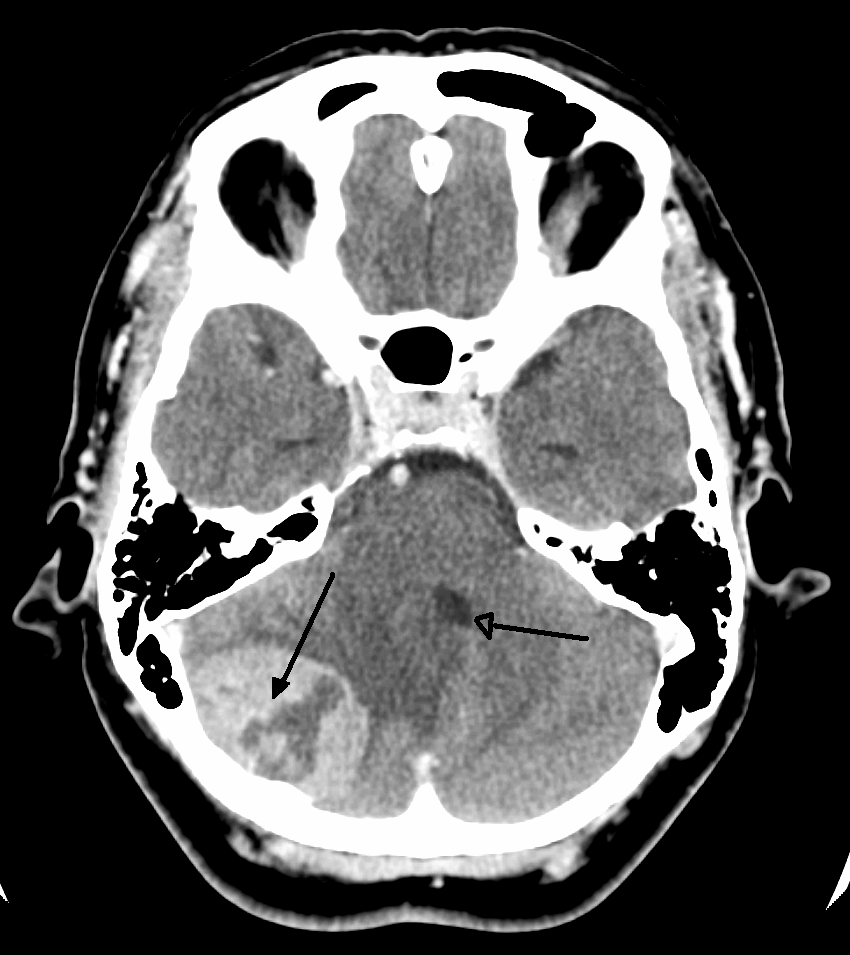
A tumor of the posterior fossa leading to mass effect and shift of the fourth ventricle

Video (44 sec). Demonstrationg how cerebellum sits in the posterior cranial fossa.

== See also ==
- Anterior cranial fossa
- Middle cranial fossa
