= Superior petrosal sinus =

Vein channel in the brain

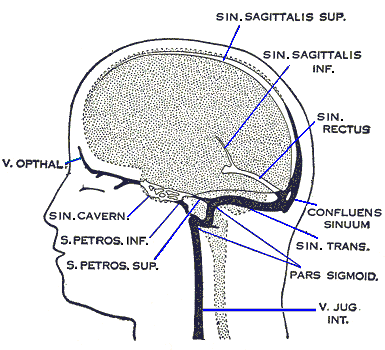
- Dural veins

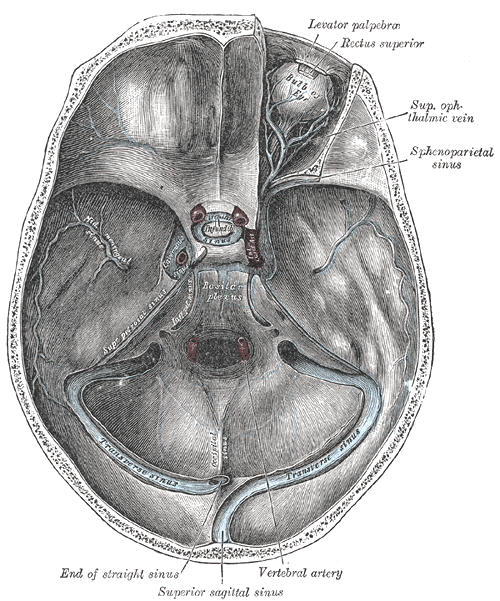
- The sinuses at the base of the skull. (Superior petrosal sinus visible at center left.)

Details
- Source: Cavernous sinus
- Drains to: Transverse sinus

Identifiers
- Latin: sinus petrosus superior
- TA98: A12.3.05.115
- TA2: 4850
- FMA: 50771

The superior petrosal sinus is one of the dural venous sinuses located beneath the brain. It receives blood from the cavernous sinus and passes backward and laterally to drain into the transverse sinus. The sinus receives superior petrosal veins, some cerebellar veins, some inferior cerebral veins, and veins from the tympanic cavity. They may be affected by arteriovenous malformation or arteriovenous fistula, usually treated with surgery.

== Structure ==
The superior petrosal sinus is located beneath the brain. It originates from the cavernous sinus. It passes backward and laterally to drain into the transverse sinus.

The sinus runs in the attached margin of the tentorium cerebelli, in a groove in the petrous part of the temporal bone formed by the sinus itself - the superior petrosal sulcus.

== Function ==
The superior petrosal sinus drains many veins of the brain, including superior petrosal veins, some cerebellar veins, some inferior cerebral veins, and veins from the tympanic cavity.

== Clinical significance ==
The superior petrosal sinus may be affected by an arteriovenous malformation or arteriovenous fistula. Most do not resolve by themselves. They may be treated with endovascular surgery or open surgery.

== Additional images ==
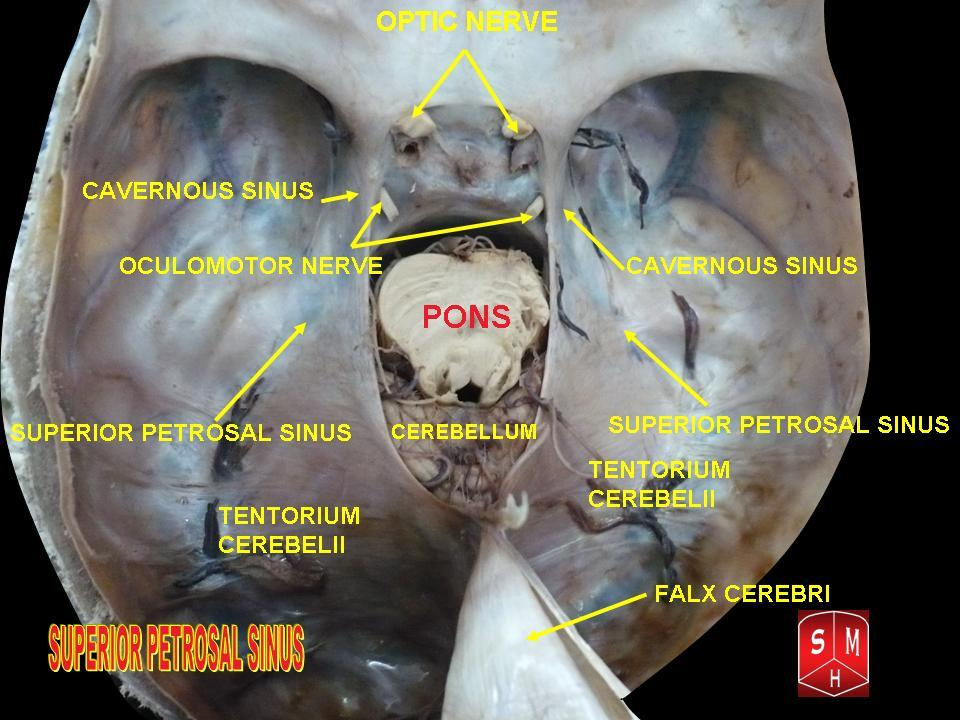
Superior petrosal sinus
