= Sinus rectus =

Sinus rectus may refer to:

- Sinus rectus (trigonometry), a historical name for the sine, a trigonometrical function in mathematics
- Sinus rectus (anatomy), another name for the straight sinus, an area in the skull below the brain
