= Occipital bun =

Prominent bulge of the occipital bone at the back of the skull

An occipital bun, also called an occipital spur, occipital knob, chignon hook or inion hook, is a prominent bulge or projection of the occipital bone at the back of the skull. It is important in scientific descriptions of classic Neanderthal crania. It is found among archaic Homo species (including Neanderthals), as well as Upper Pleistocene Homo sapiens and present-day human populations.

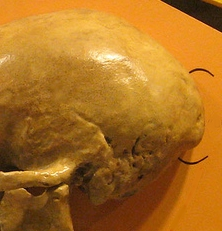
The occipital bun on a Neanderthal skull

== Occipital buns in Neanderthals ==
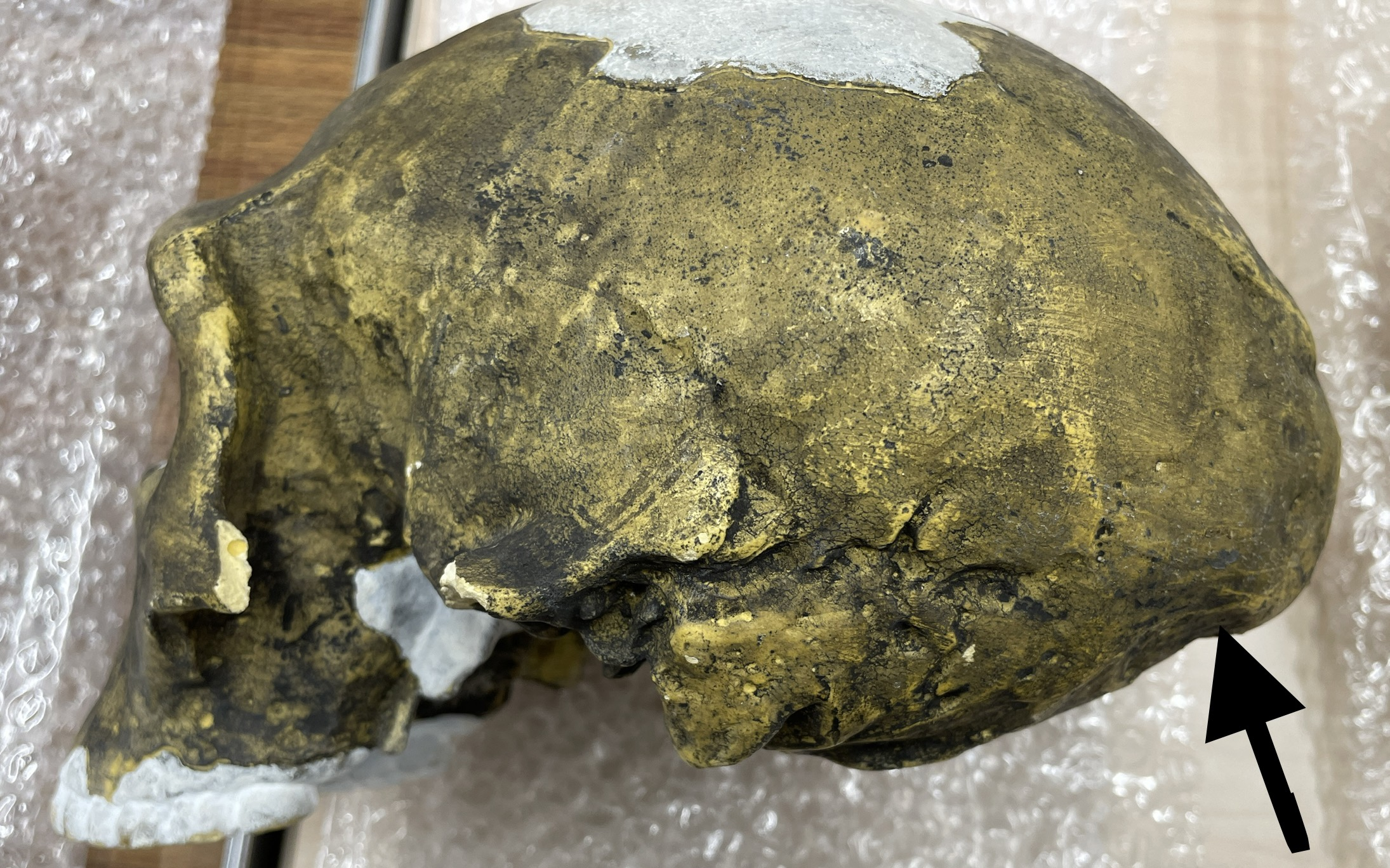
The occipital bun pointed out on a Neanderthal skull

The occipital bun is a protuberance of the occipital bone. Its size and shape has been compared to that of a dinner roll. It is a quintessential trait of Neanderthals, though it is a trend in archaic Homo species. The true purpose of the occipital bun has not yet been defined. However, some studies have found possible evolutionary purposes. In a study published in Proceedings of the Royal Society B, the occipital bun has been attributed to the enlargement of the visual cortex; this is hypothesized to be an adaptation to lower light levels found in the higher latitudes of Europe. This enlarged visual cortex also correlates with larger eyes among Neanderthals. The occipital bun has also been hypothesized to function in relieving stress on the neck muscles, offsetting the weight of the Neanderthal's heavier, more robust face.

== Homology ==
A study conducted by Lieberman, Pearson and Mowbray provides evidence that individuals with narrow heads (dolichocephalic) or narrow cranial bases and relatively large brains are more likely to have occipital buns as a means of resolving a spatial packing problem. This differs from Neanderthals, who have wider cranial bases. This suggests that there is no homology in the occipital buns of Neanderthals and Homo sapiens.

In addition to Neanderthals, fossilized early modern Homo sapiens of Europe have been found to have occipital buns. Many current-day modern human populations, including Sami, the bushmen of South Africa, and Indigenous Australians, have frequent occurrences of occipital buns. However, as previously mentioned, there is no evidence of homology between Neanderthals and Homo sapiens.

== Occipital buns in Homo sapiens ==
As mentioned above, fossilized early modern Homo sapiens of Europe, as well as current-day modern human populations, such as the Sámi, the bushmen of South Africa, and Indigenous Australians, have some prevalence of occipital buns. In the Iberian Peninsula, it is somewhat common in Galicians, Northern Portugueses, Asturians and Basques.

== Difference between occipital bun and occipital torus ==
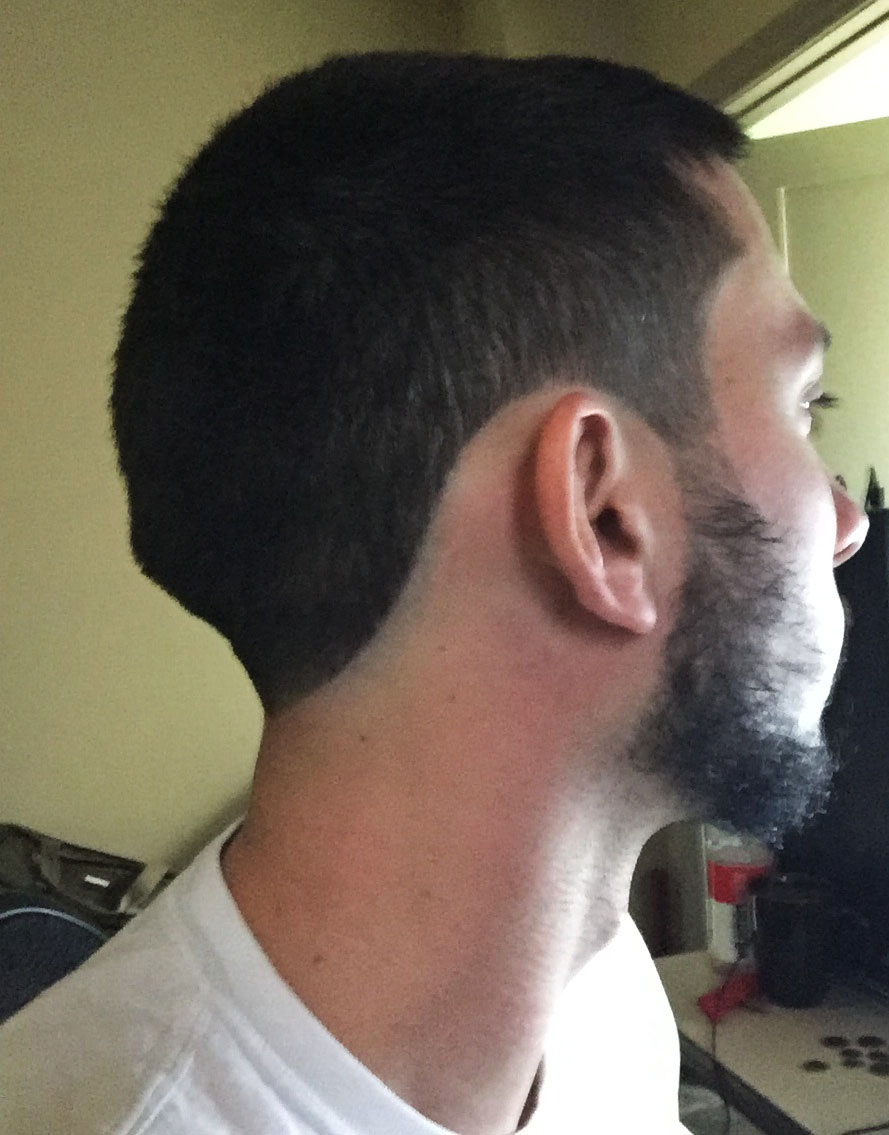
Occipital bun on a modern human male

Although the terms occipital bun and occipital torus (torus occipitale), as well as all the other names used in this article, are sometimes used as synonyms, it is important to differentiate between these two anatomical concepts.

The occipital torus refers to an outward projection of the inion, the most prominent part of the external occipital protuberance (EOP). While there is no widely used classification, the EOP is typically classified morphologically as: type I (smooth), type II (crest), type III (spur), and sometimes a type IV (hook). The name occipital torus usually refers to types III and IV. In some cases, individuals with prominent occipital torus experience a range of symptoms. The most common symptoms include tenderness at the back of the skull while lying down and/or when moving the neck. A surgical procedure can be done to reduce the size of the occipital bun and relieve symptoms.

The occipital bun, which is the subject of this article, is a rounded bulge or protuberance of the squamous part of the occipital bone, located below the internal occipital protuberance.

== See also ==
- Bone terminology
- External occipital protuberance
- Terms for anatomical location
