= Cruciform eminence =

Part of the occipital bone in the skull

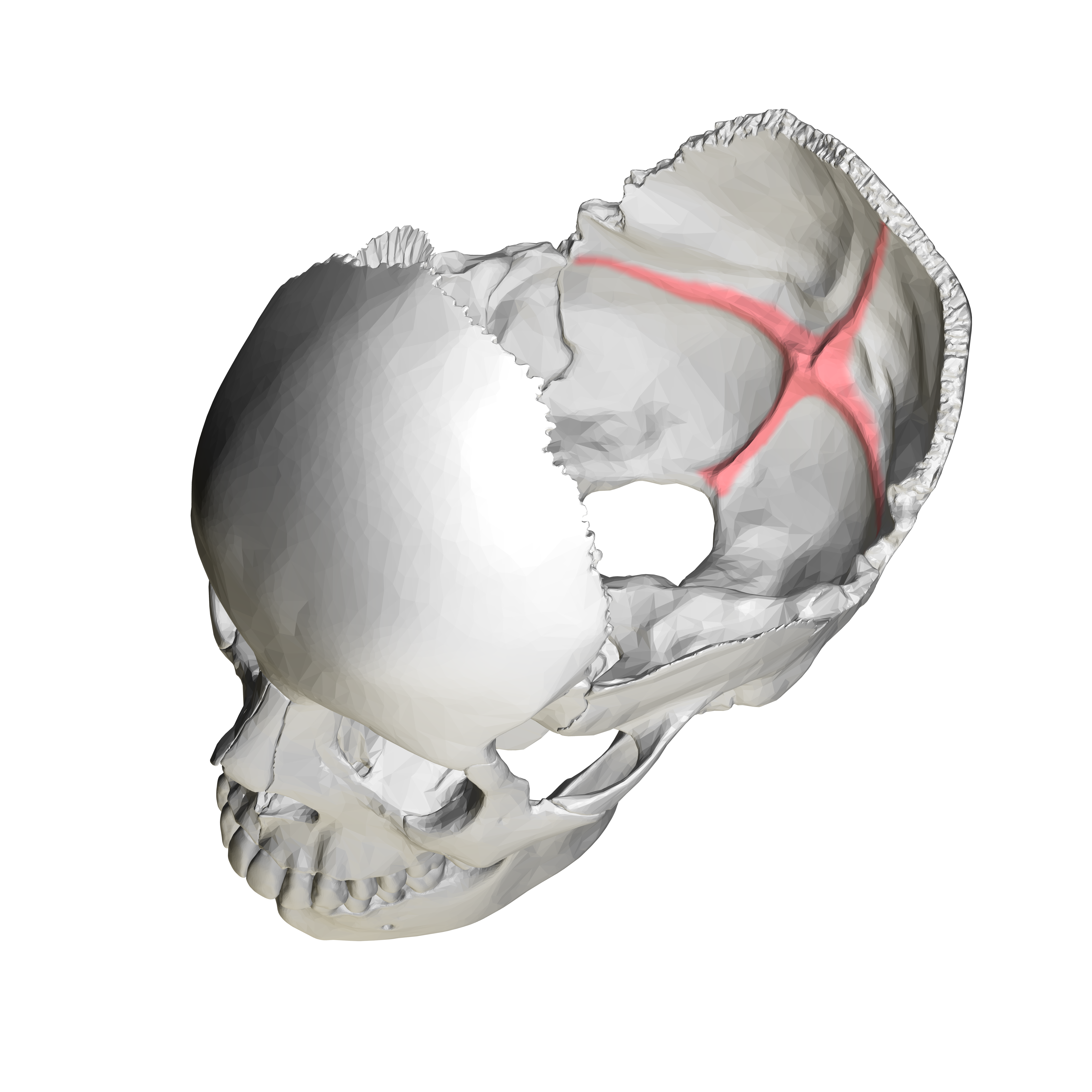
- Human skull. Position of cruciform eminence is shown in red.

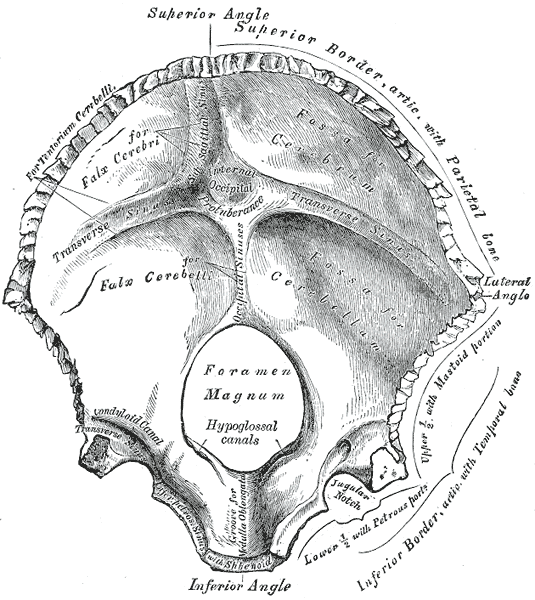
- Occipital bone. Inner surface.

Details

Identifiers
- Latin: eminentia cruciformis
- TA98: A02.1.04.028
- TA2: 574
- FMA: 75754

The cruciform eminence (or cruciate eminence) divides the deeply concave internal surface of the occipital bone into four fossae:

- The upper two fossae are called the cerebral fossae, are triangular and lodge the occipital lobes of the cerebrum.
- The lower two are called the cerebellar fossae, are quadrilateral and accommodate the hemispheres of the cerebellum.

The upper fossae are separated from the lower fossae by a groove for the transverse sinuses. At the point of intersection between all four fossae is the internal occipital protuberance.

== Additional images ==
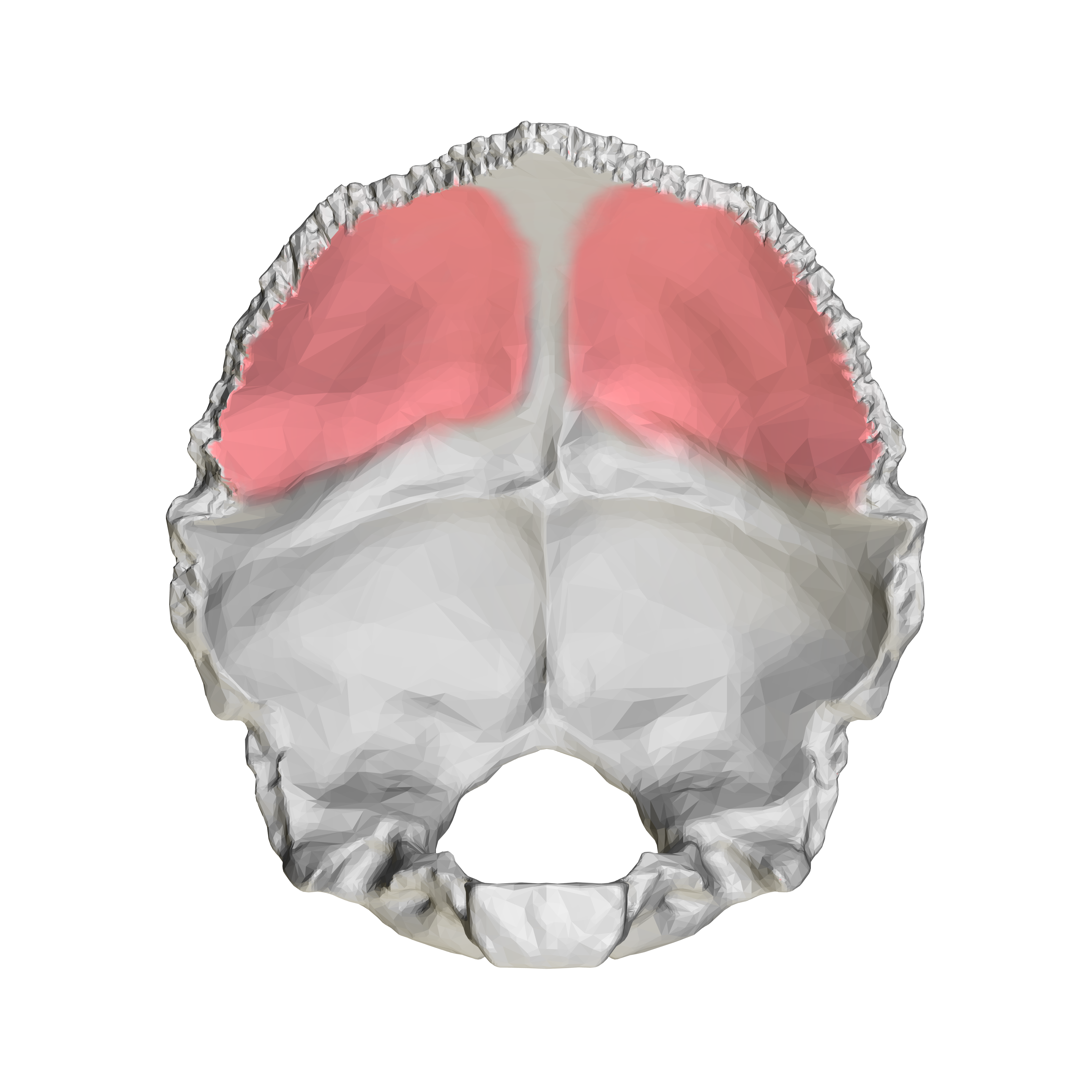
Cerebral fossa (shown in red)

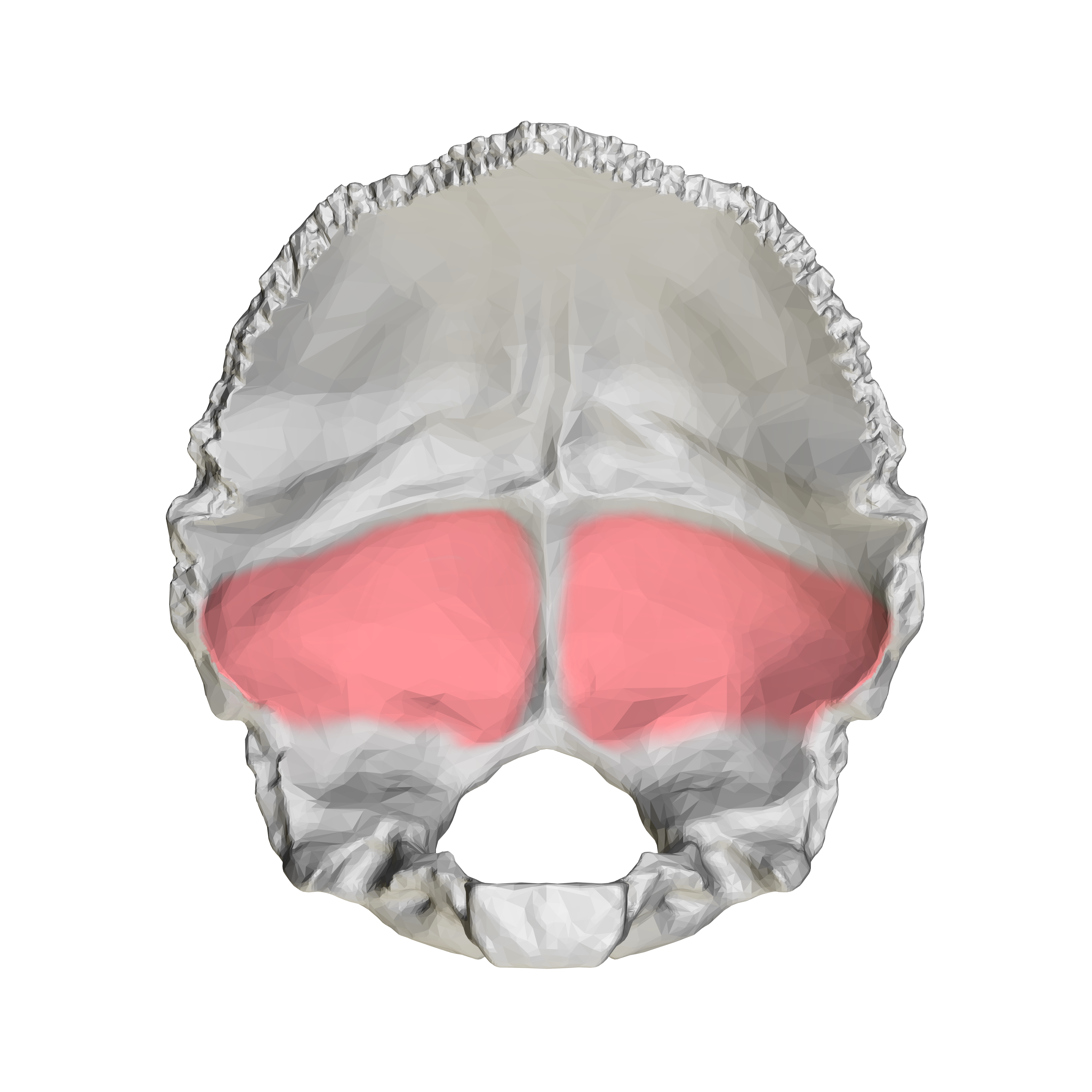
Cerebellar fossa (shown in red)
