= Petrosquamous sinus =

Vein found in human fetuses

Details

Identifiers
- Latin: sinus petrosquamosus
- TA98: A12.3.05.107
- TA2: 4851
- FMA: 50777

The petrosquamous sinus is a fetal vein that generally disappears by birth and, when present, runs backward along the junction of the squama and petrous portion of the temporal, and opens into the transverse sinus.
