= External occipital protuberance =

Part of the human skull

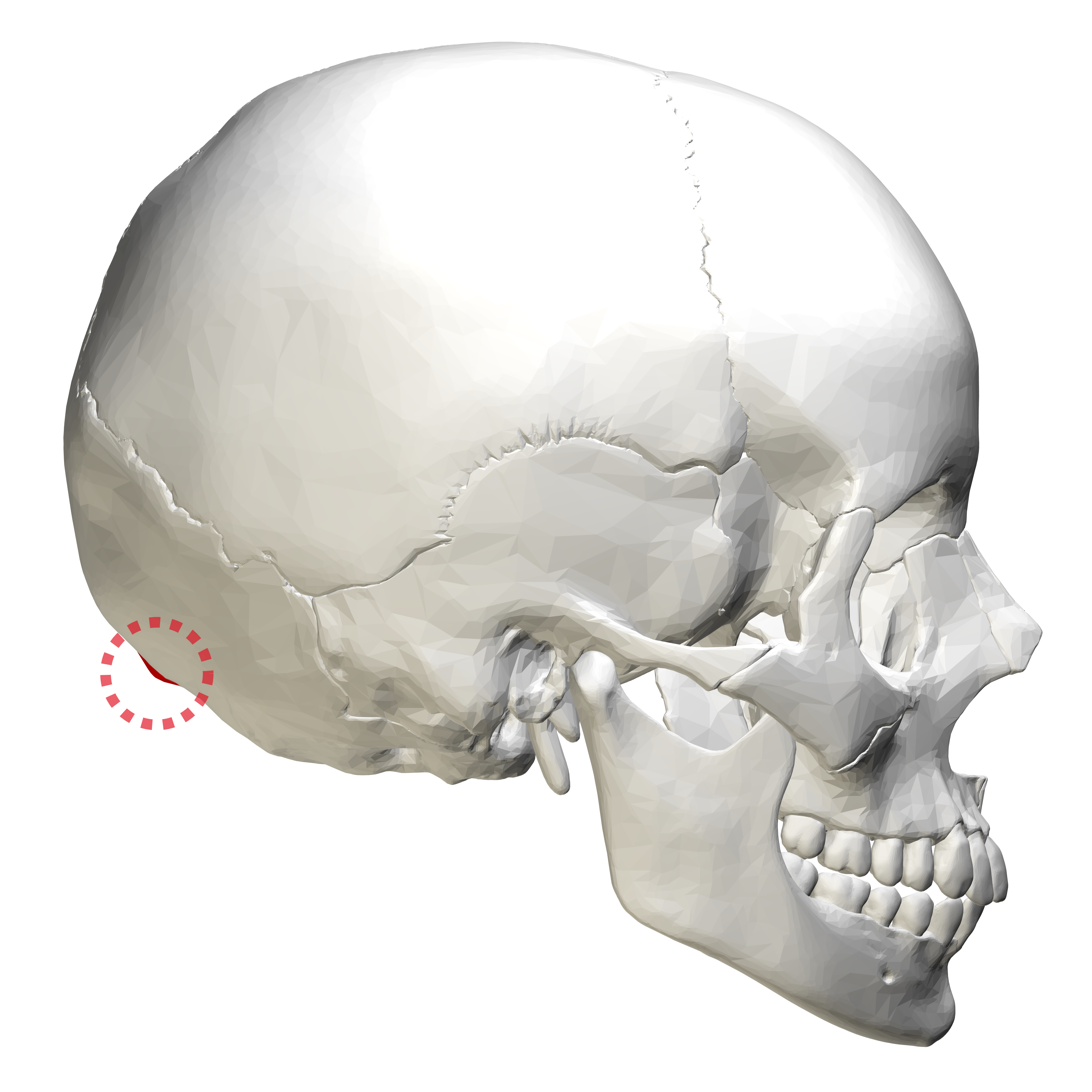
- Human skull lateral view. External occipital protuberance shown in red.

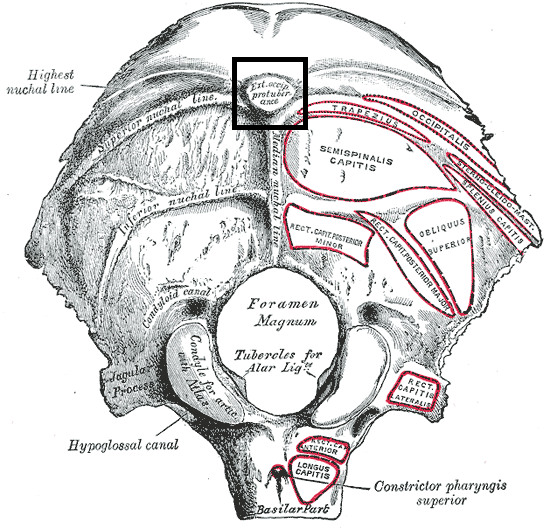
- Occipital bone seen from below. Outer surface. (External occipital protuberance visible at top center.)

Details

Identifiers
- Latin: protuberantia occipitalis externa
- TA98: A02.1.04.022
- TA2: 568
- FMA: 75752

Near the middle of the squamous part of occipital bone is the external occipital protuberance, the highest point of which is referred to as the inion. The inion is the most prominent projection of the protuberance which is located at the posteroinferior (rear lower) part of the human skull. The nuchal ligament and trapezius muscle attach to it.

The inion (ἰνίον, iníon, Greek for the occipital bone) is used as a landmark in the 10-20 system in electroencephalography (EEG) recording. Extending laterally from it on either side is the superior nuchal line, and above it is the faintly marked highest nuchal line.

A study of 16th-century Anatolian remains showed that the external occipital protuberance statistically tends to be less pronounced in female remains.

== Additional images ==
Position of external occipital protuberance (shown in red). Animation.

== See also ==
- Internal occipital protuberance
- Occipital bun
