= Transverse sinuses =

Vein channel in the skull

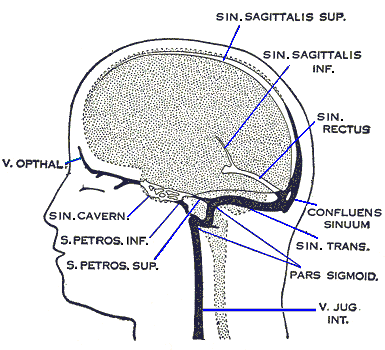
- Dural veins. (Transverse sinuses labeled as "sin. trans." at center right.)

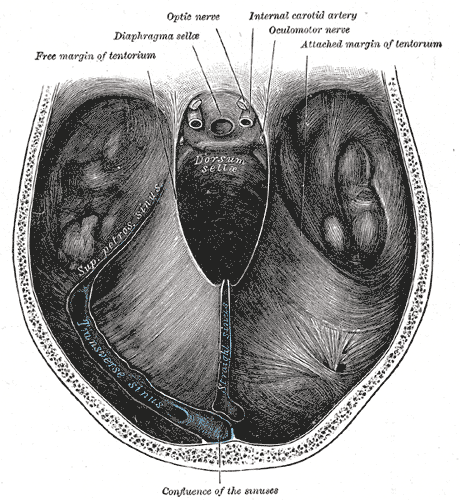
- The transverse sinuses are formed by the tentorium cerebelli and drain into the right and left sigmoid sinuses.

Details
- Source: Confluence of sinuses, superior sagittal sinus
- Drains to: Sigmoid sinuses

Identifiers
- Latin: sinus transversus durae matris
- MeSH: D054064
- TA98: A12.3.05.102
- TA2: 4849
- FMA: 50763

The transverse sinuses (left and right lateral sinuses), within the human head, are two areas beneath the brain which allow blood to drain from the back of the head. They run laterally in a groove along the interior surface of the occipital bone. They drain from the confluence of sinuses (by the internal occipital protuberance) to the sigmoid sinuses, which ultimately connect to the internal jugular vein. See diagram (at right): labeled under the brain as "sin. trans." (for Latin: sinus transversus).

== Structure ==
The transverse sinuses are of large size and begin at the internal occipital protuberance; one, generally the right, being the direct continuation of the superior sagittal sinus, the other of the straight sinus.

Each transverse sinus passes lateral and forward, describing a slight curve with its convexity upward, to the base of the petrous portion of the temporal bone, and lies, in this part of its course, in the attached margin of the tentorium cerebelli; it then leaves the tentorium and curves downward and medialward (an area sometimes referred to as the sigmoid sinus) to reach the jugular foramen, where it ends in the internal jugular vein.

In its course it rests upon the squama of the occipital, the mastoid angle of the parietal, the mastoid part of the temporal, and, just before its termination, the jugular process of the occipital; the portion which occupies the groove on the mastoid part of the temporal is sometimes termed the sigmoid sinus.

The transverse sinuses are frequently of unequal size, with the one formed by the superior sagittal sinus being the larger; they increase in size as they proceed, from back to center.

On transverse section, the horizontal portion exhibits a prismatic form, the curved portion has a semicylindrical form.

They receive the blood from the superior petrosal sinuses at the base of the petrous portion of the temporal bone; they communicate with the veins of the pericranium by means of the mastoid and condyloid emissary veins; and they receive some of the inferior cerebral and inferior cerebellar veins, and some veins from the diploë.

The petrosquamous sinus, when present, runs backward along the junction of the squama and petrous portion of the temporal, and opens into the transverse sinus.

== Additional images ==
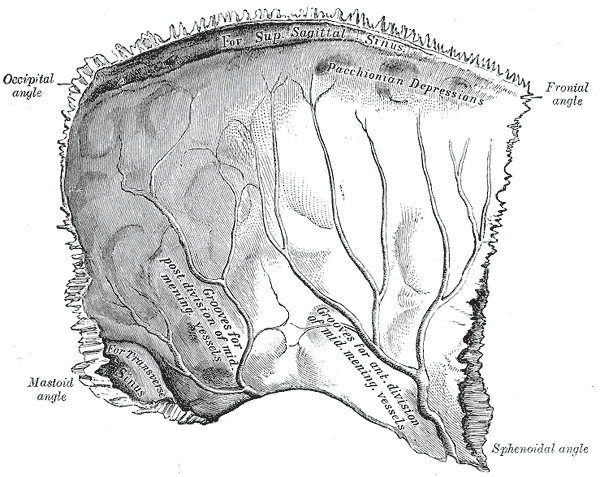
Left parietal bone. Inner surface.

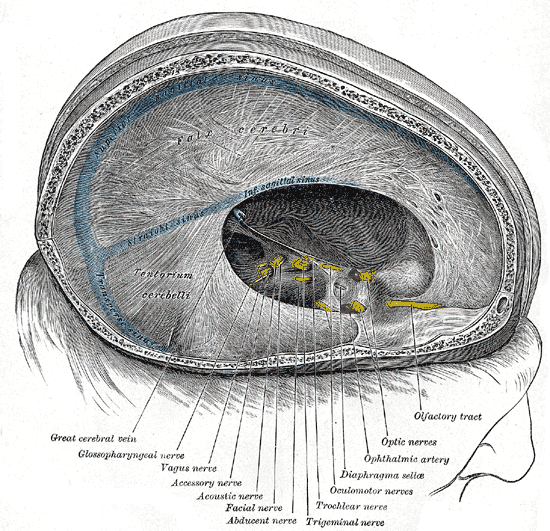
Dura mater and its processes exposed by removing part of the right half of the skull, and the brain

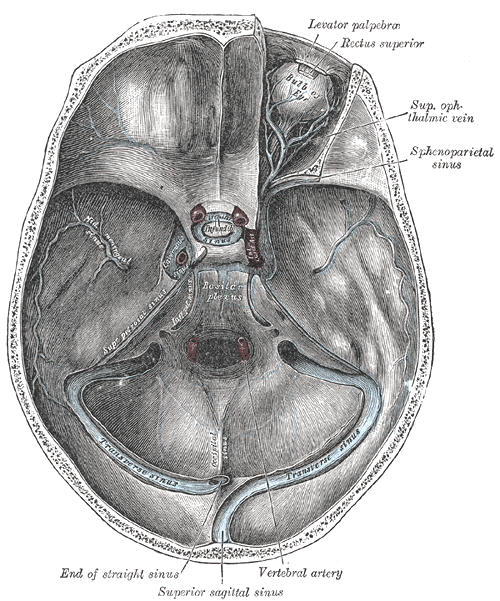
The sinuses at the base of the skull

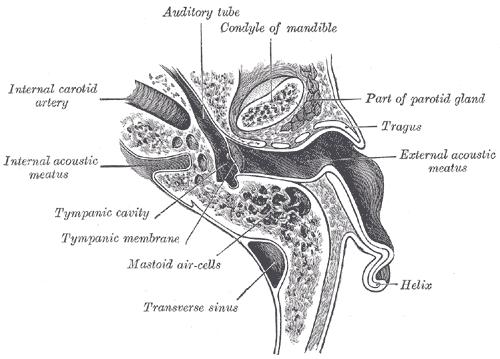
Horizontal section through left ear; upper half of section

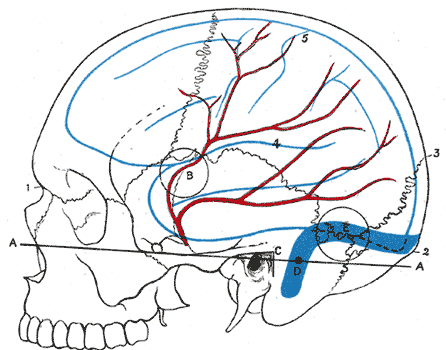
Relations of the brain and middle meningeal artery to the surface of the skull

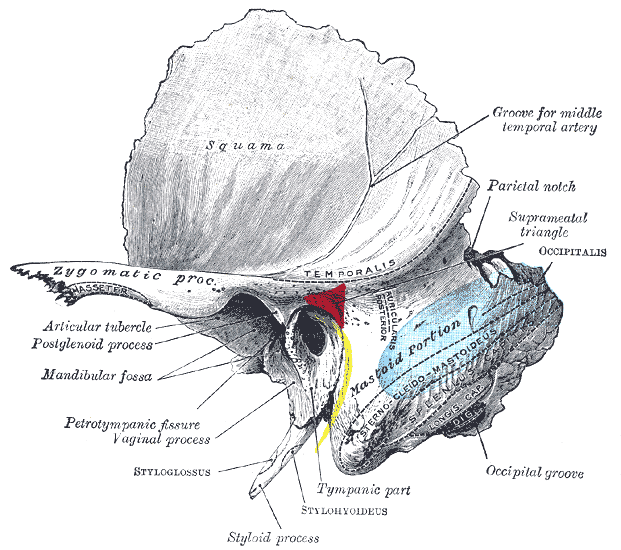
Left temporal bone showing surface markings for the tympanic antrum (red), transverse sinus (blue), and facial nerve (yellow)

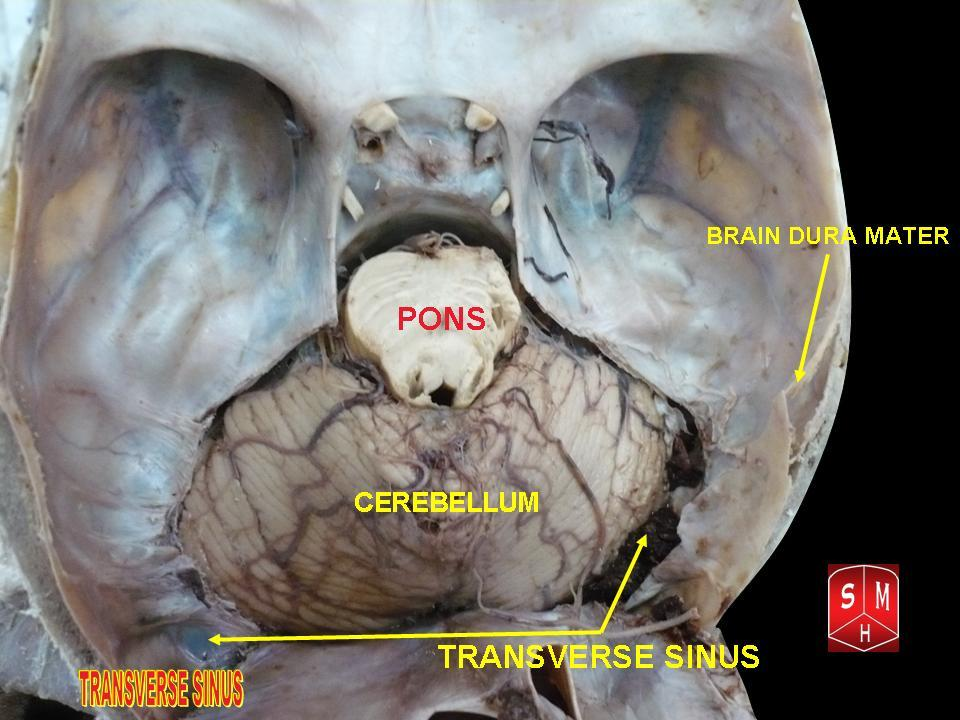
Transverse sinuses

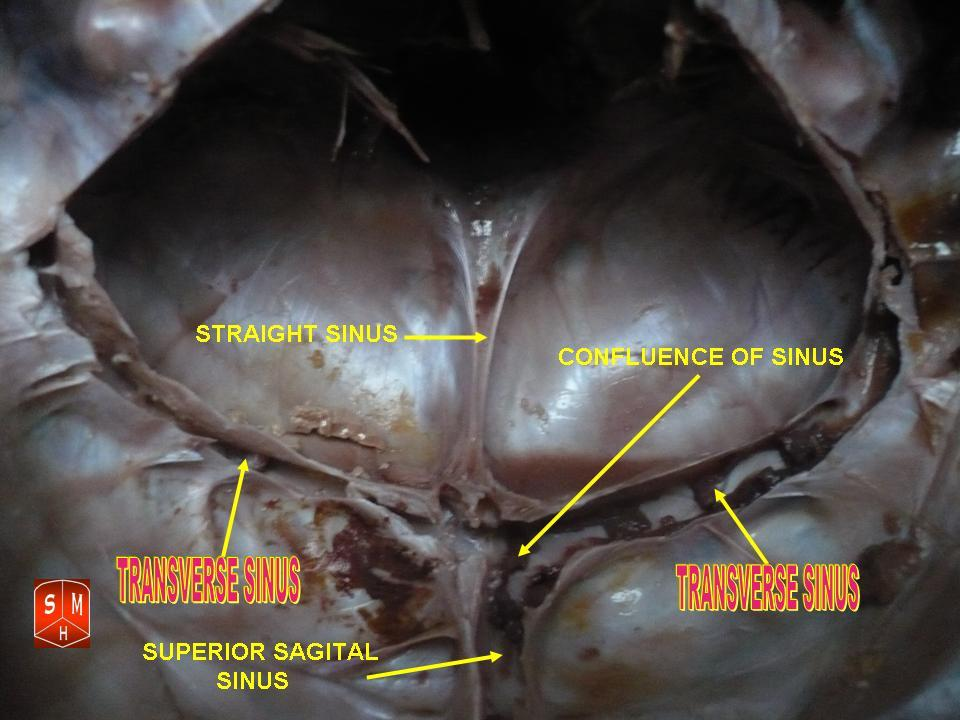
Transverse sinuses

== See also ==
- Dural venous sinuses
