= Straight sinus =

Venous sinus draining the brain

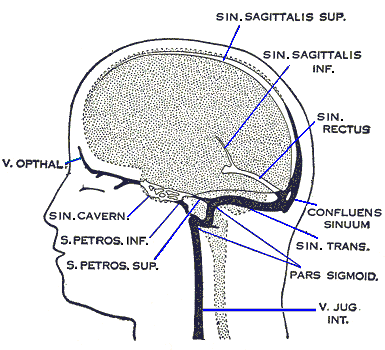
- Dural veins (Straight sinus labeled as 'SIN. RECTUS' at center right.)

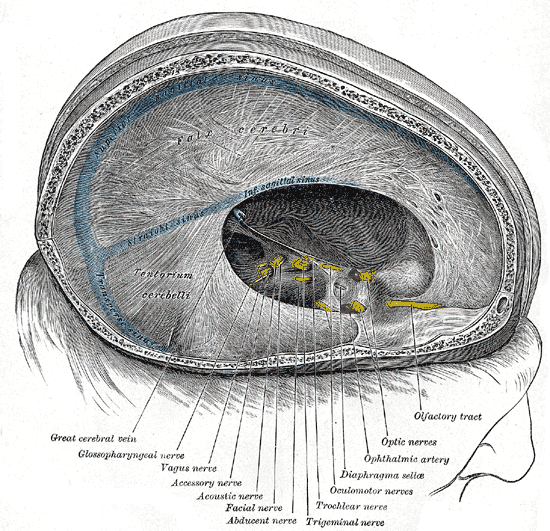
- Dura mater and its processes exposed by removing part of the right half of the skull, and the brain. (Straight sinus visible as blue line at center left.)

Details
- Source: Inferior sagittal sinus, great cerebral vein
- Drains to: Confluence of sinuses

Identifiers
- Latin: sinus rectus
- TA98: A12.3.05.112
- TA2: 4853
- FMA: 50769

The straight sinus, also known as tentorial sinus or the sinus rectus, is an area within the skull beneath the brain. It receives blood from the inferior sagittal sinus and the great cerebral vein, and drains into the confluence of sinuses.

== Structure ==
The straight sinus is situated within the dura mater, where the falx cerebri meets the midline of tentorium cerebelli. It forms from the confluence of the inferior sagittal sinus and the great cerebral vein. It may also drain blood from the superior cerebellar veins and veins from the falx cerebri. In cross-section, it is triangular, contains a few transverse bands across its interior, and increases in size as it proceeds backward. It is usually around 5 cm long.

=== Variation ===
The straight sinus is usually an unpaired structure. However, there may be two straight sinuses, which may be one on top of the other or parallel.

== Function ==
The straight sinus allows blood to drain from the inferior center of the head outwards posteriorly. It receives blood from the inferior sagittal sinus, great cerebral vein, posterior cerebral veins, superior cerebellar veins and veins from the falx cerebri.

== Additional images ==
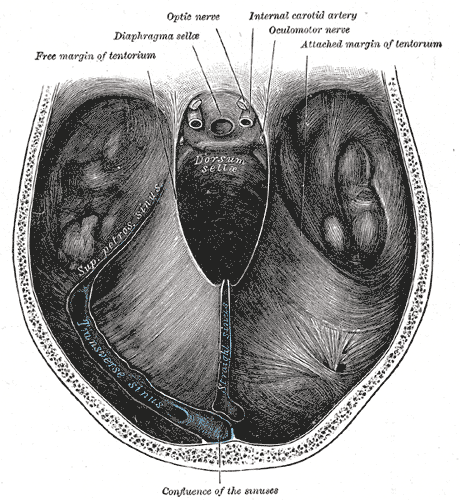
Tentorium cerebelli from above.

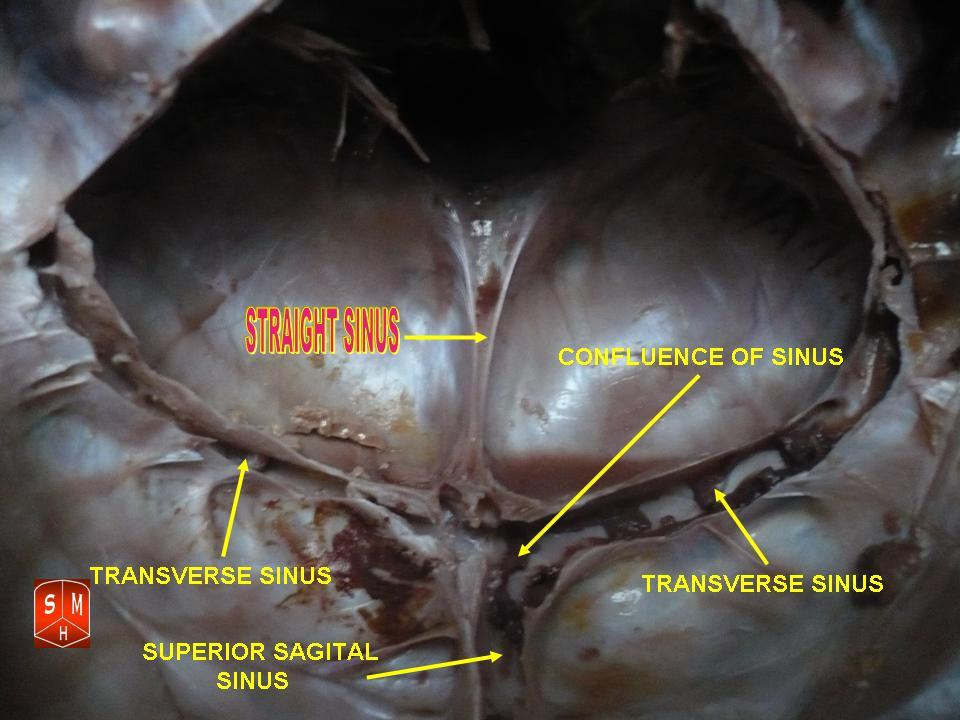
Straight sinus

== See also ==
- Dural venous sinuses
