= Groove for transverse sinus =

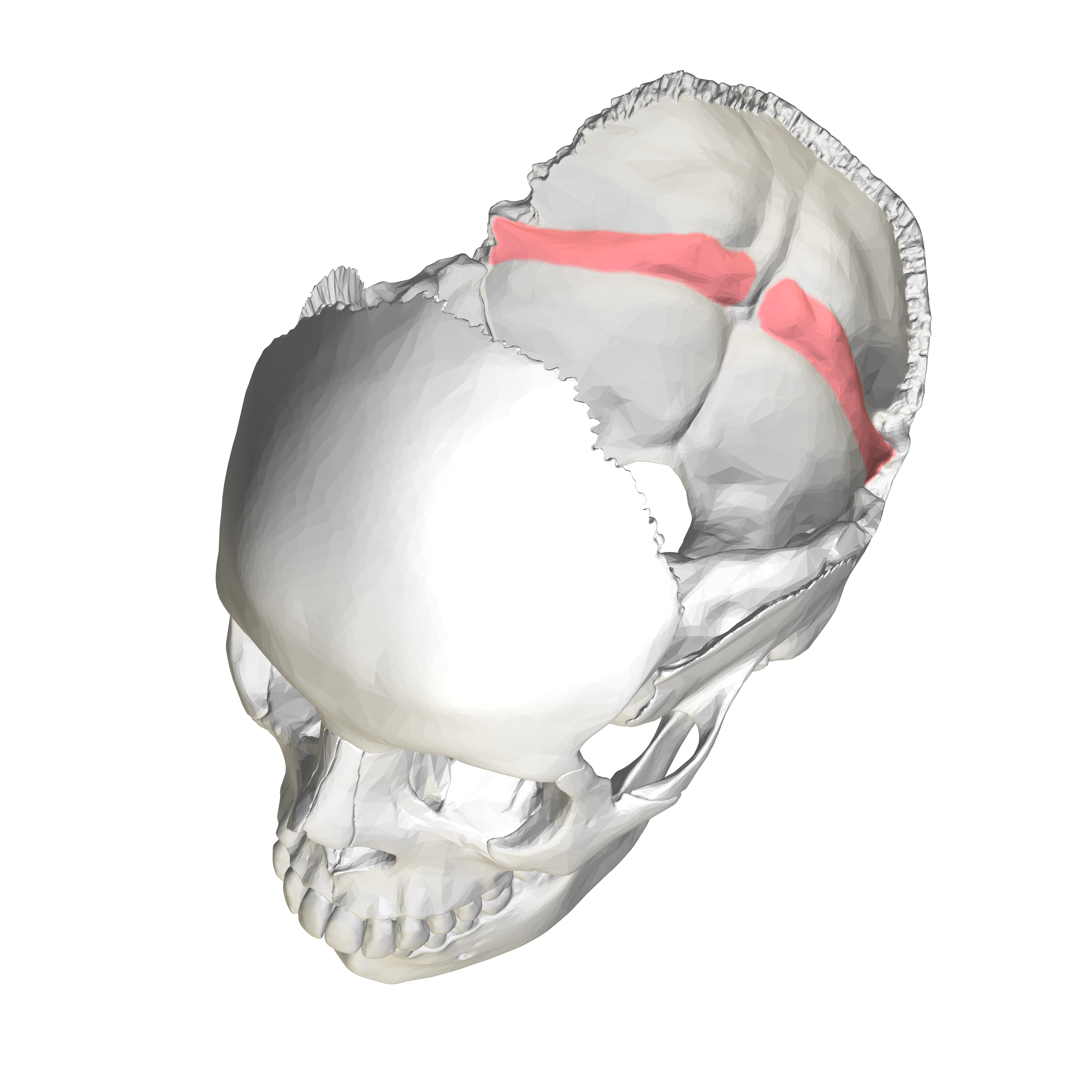
- Human skull (parietal bones removed). Position of groove for transverse sinus shown in red.

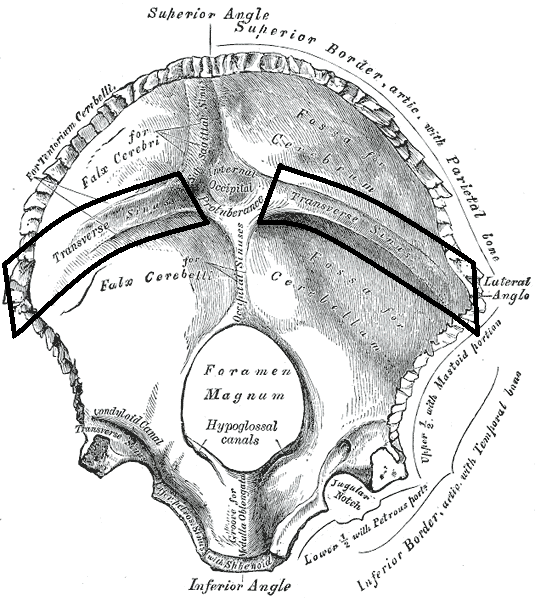
- Interior surface of occipital bone. (Groove for transverse sinus runs laterally on either side of the internal occipital protuberance.)

Details

Identifiers
- Latin: sulcus sinus transversi
- TA98: A02.1.04.031
- TA2: 577
- FMA: 75335

The groove for transverse sinus is a groove which runs along the internal surface of the occipital bone, running laterally between the superior and inferior fossae of the cruciform eminence. The transverse sinuses travel along this groove.

A small or absent bony groove in the occiput in conjunction with the compressible nature of the transverse sinus makes this structure vulnerable to tapering with increased ICP.

== Additional images ==
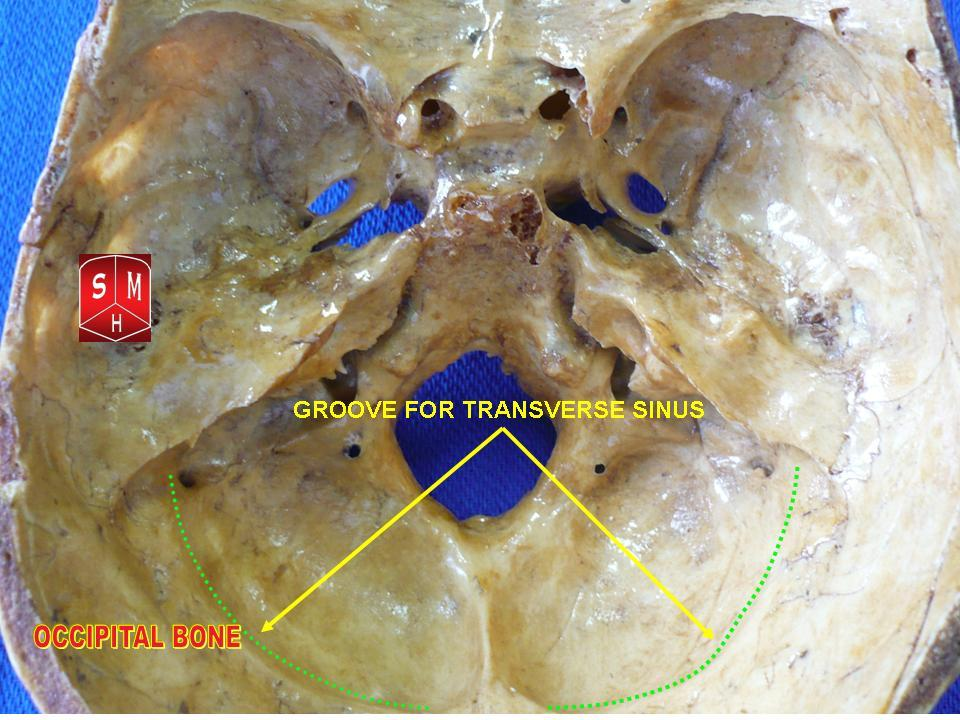
Base of the skull. Upper surface. Groove for transverse sinus labelled at bottom.

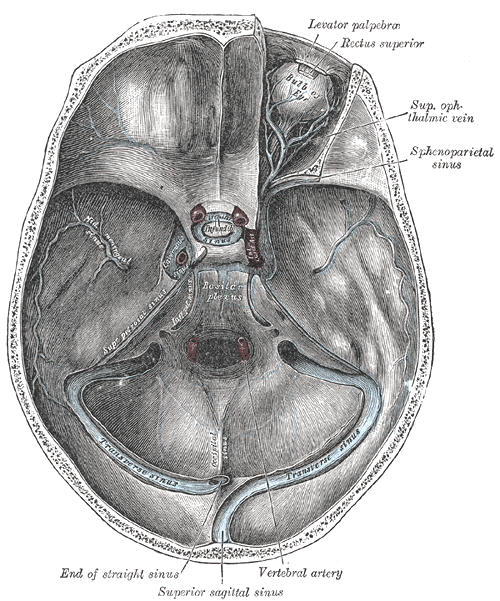
Base of the skull. Upper surface. Transverse sinuses are drawn at bottom.

== See also ==
- Internal occipital protuberance
- Occipital bone
- Transverse sinus
