= Internal occipital protuberance =

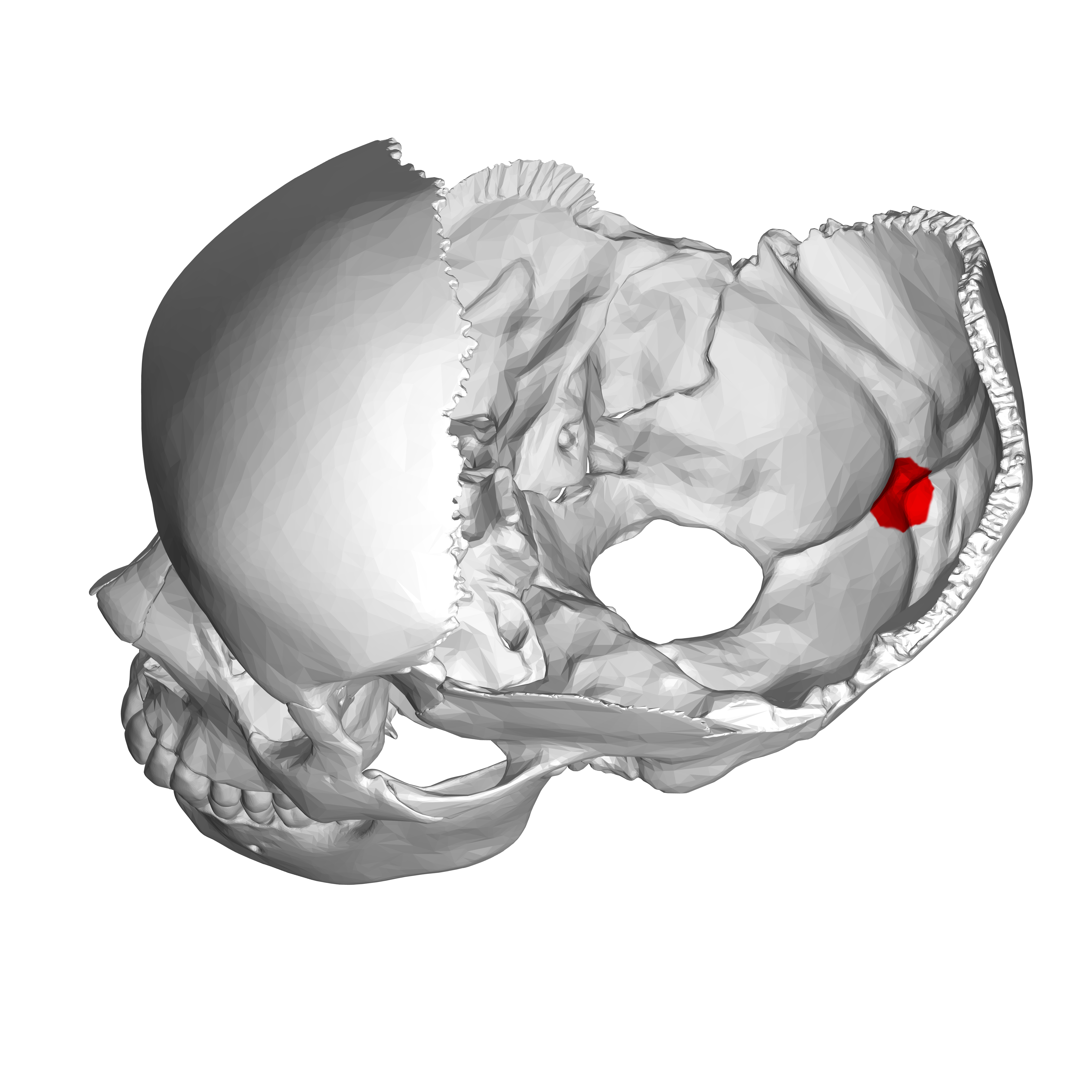
- Position of internal occipital protuberance (shown in red). Parietal bones removed.

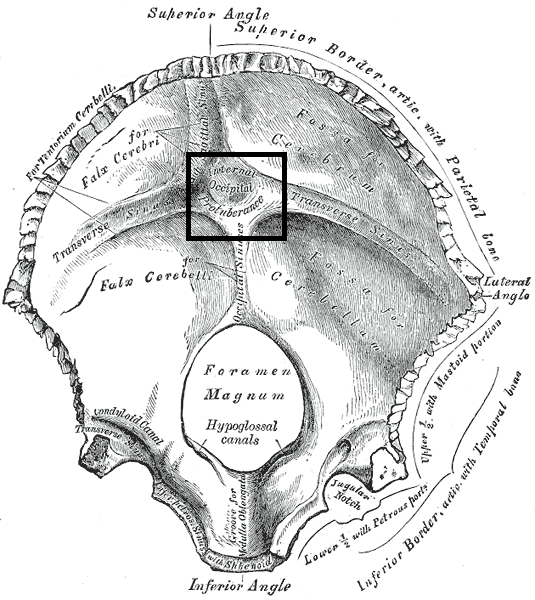
- Occipital bone. Inner surface. (Internal occipital protuberance visible at center, at the center of the horizontal and vertical lines.)

Details

Identifiers
- Latin: protuberantia occipitalis interna
- TA98: A02.1.04.029
- TA2: 575
- FMA: 75755

Along the internal surface of the occipital bone, at the point of intersection of the four divisions of the cruciform eminence, is the internal occipital protuberance. Running transversely on either side is a groove for the transverse sinus.

== Additional images ==
Human skull. Internal occipital protuberance shown in red. Parietal bones and temporal bones are removed.

== See also ==
- External occipital protuberance
