= Superficial cerebral veins =

Details

Identifiers
- Latin: venae superficiales cerebri
- TA98: A12.3.06.002
- TA2: 4902
- FMA: 70862

The superficial cerebral veins are a group of cerebral veins in the head. The superficial veins of the brain are those veins that are close to the surface of the brain.

This group includes the superior cerebral veins, the superficial middle cerebral vein, the inferior cerebral veins, the inferior anastomotic vein and the superior anastomotic vein. The superior group empty into the superior sagittal sinus, and inferior sagittal sinus, and the inferior group empty into the transverse sinuses and the cavernous sinuses.
