= Cerebral venous sinus thrombosis =

Presence of a blood clot in the dural venous sinuses or cerebral veins

- Other names: Cerebral venous and sinus thrombosis, (superior) sagittal sinus thrombosis, dural sinus thrombosis, intracranial venous thrombosis, cerebral thrombophlebitis
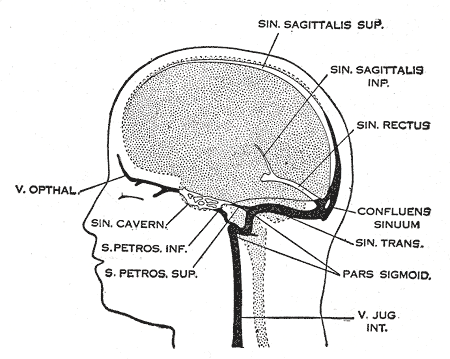
- Dural veins
- Specialty: Neurology
- Treatment: Low molecular weight heparin

Cerebral venous sinus thrombosis (CVST), cerebral venous and sinus thrombosis or cerebral venous thrombosis (CVT), is the presence of a blood clot in the dural venous sinuses (which drain blood from the brain), the cerebral veins, or both. Symptoms may include severe headache, visual symptoms, any of the symptoms of stroke such as weakness of the face and limbs on one side of the body, and seizures, which occur in around 40% of patients.

The diagnosis is usually by computed tomography (CT scan) or magnetic resonance imaging (MRI) to demonstrate obstruction of the venous sinuses. After confirmation of the diagnosis, investigations may be performed to determine the underlying cause, especially if one is not readily apparent.

Treatment is typically with anticoagulants (medications that suppress blood clotting) such as low molecular weight heparin. Rarely, thrombolysis (enzymatic destruction of the blood clot) or mechanical thrombectomy is used, although evidence for this therapy is limited. The disease may be complicated by raised intracranial pressure, which may warrant surgical intervention such as the placement of a shunt.

== Signs and symptoms ==
Nine in ten people with cerebral venous thrombosis have a headache; this tends to worsen over the period of several days, but may also develop suddenly (thunderclap headache). The headache may be the only symptom. Many have symptoms of stroke: inability to move one or more limbs, weakness on one side of the face or difficulty speaking. The neurologic deficits related to central venous thromboses does not necessarily affect one side of the body or one arterial or brain territory as is more common "arterial" strokes. Bilateral sixth cranial nerve palsies may occur, causing abnormalities related to eye movement, but this is rare.

40% of people have seizures, although it is more common in women who develop sinus thrombosis peripartum (in the period before and after giving birth). These are mostly seizures affecting only one part of the body and unilateral (occurring on one side), but occasionally the seizures are generalised and rarely they lead to status epilepticus (persistent or recurrent seizure activity for a long period of time).

In the elderly, many of the aforementioned symptoms may not occur. Common symptoms in the elderly with this condition are otherwise unexplained changes in mental status and a depressed level of consciousness.

The pressure around the brain may rise, causing papilledema (swelling of the optic disc) which may be experienced as visual obscurations. In severely raised intracranial pressure, the level of consciousness is decreased, the blood pressure rises, the heart rate falls and there is abnormal posturing.

Focal neurologic deficits may occur hours to days after the headache in 50% of cases, this may present as hemiparesis (unilateral weakness) if due to infarction of the frontal or parietal lobe which are drained by the vein of Trolard. Focal deficits may also present as aphasia or confusion if the vein of Labbe (responsible for draining the temporal lobe) is affected.

== Causes ==
Disorders that cause, or increase the risk for systemic venous thrombosis are associated with central venous thromboses. In children, head and neck infections and acute systemic illnesses are the primary cause of central venous thrombosis. Cerebral venous sinus thrombosis is more common in particular situations. 85% of people have at least one of these risk factors:

- Thrombophilia, a tendency to develop blood clots due to abnormalities in coagulation, e.g. factor V Leiden, deficiency of protein C, protein S or antithrombin, or related problems
- Nephrotic syndrome, a kidney problem causing protein loss in the urine
- Chronic inflammatory diseases, such as inflammatory bowel disease, lupus and Behçet's disease
- Pregnancy and puerperium (the period after giving birth)
- Particular blood disorders, especially polycythemia vera and paroxysmal nocturnal hemoglobinuria
- Use of estrogen-containing forms of hormonal contraception
- Meningitis and infections of the ear, nose and throat area such as mastoiditis and sinusitis
- Direct injury to the venous sinuses
- Medical procedures in the head and neck area
- Obesity, especially in combination with oral contraceptive use
- Sickle cell anemia
- Dehydration, primarily in infants and children
- Homocysteinemia
- Homocystinuria

== Diagnosis ==
The diagnosis may be suspected on the basis of the symptoms, for example the combination of headache, signs of raised intracranial pressure and focal neurological abnormalities, or when alternative causes of headache and neurological abnormalities, such as a subarachnoid hemorrhage, have been excluded.

=== Imaging ===
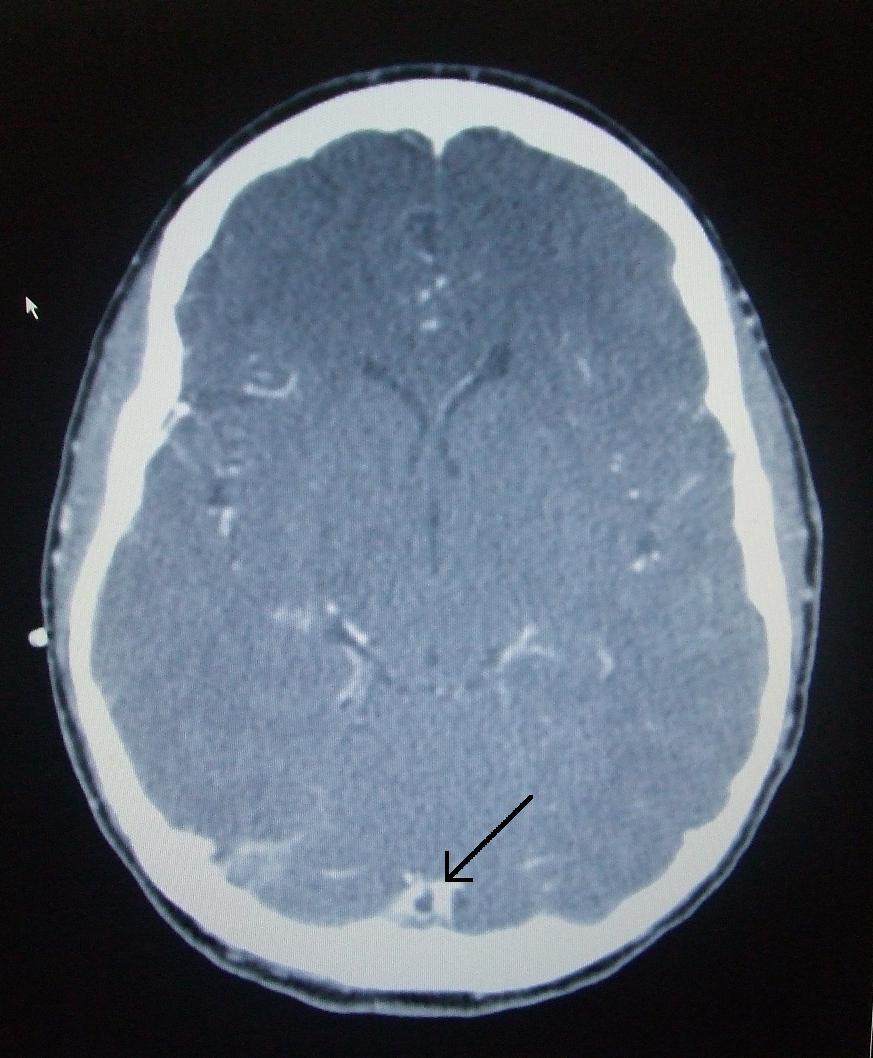
CT venogram showing a filling defect in the sagittal sinus (black arrow)

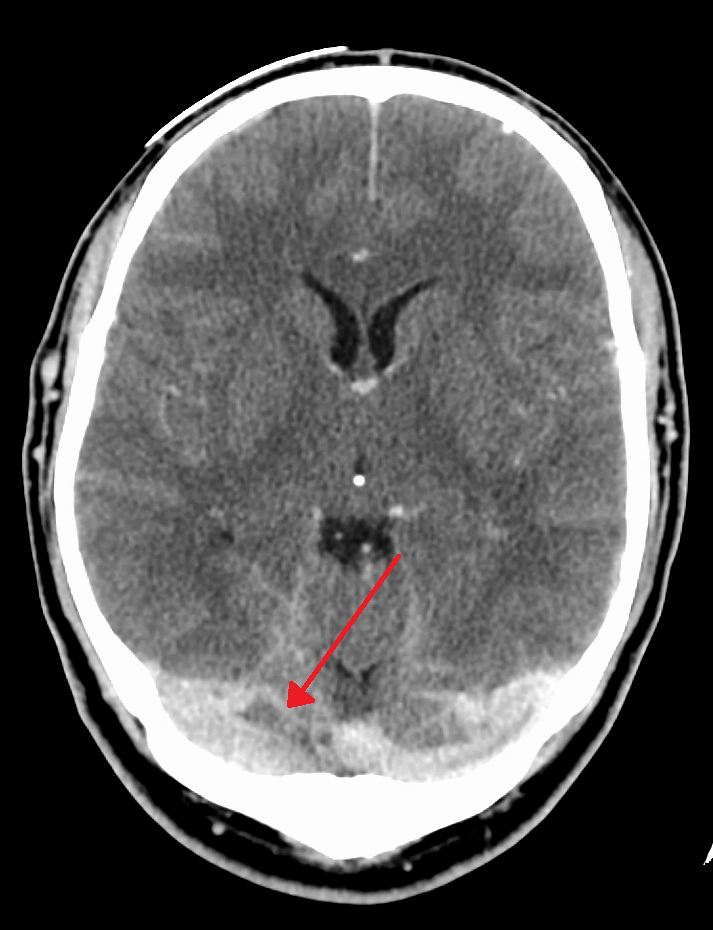
A dural venous sinus thrombosis of the transverse sinus. Greater on the right than left.

There are various neuroimaging investigations that may detect cerebral sinus thrombosis. Cerebral edema and venous infarction may be apparent on any modality, but for the detection of the thrombus itself, the most commonly used tests are computed tomography (CT) and magnetic resonance imaging (MRI), both using various types of radiocontrast to perform a venogram and visualise the veins around the brain.

Computed tomography, with radiocontrast in the venous phase (CT venography or CTV), has a detection rate that in some regards exceeds that of MRI. The test involves injection into a vein (usually in the arm) of a radioopaque substance, and time is allowed for the bloodstream to carry it to the cerebral veins – at which point the scan is performed. It has a sensitivity of 75–100% (it detects 75–100% of all clots present), and a specificity of 81–100% (it would be incorrectly positive in 0–19%). In the first two weeks, the "empty delta sign" may be observed (in later stages, this sign may disappear). The empty delta sign is characterized by enhancement of the dural wall without intra-sinus enhancement.

Magnetic resonance venography employs the same principles, but uses MRI as a scanning modality. MRI has the advantage of being better at detecting damage to the brain itself as a result of the increased pressure on the obstructed veins, but it is not readily available in many hospitals and the interpretation may be difficult.

Cerebral angiography may demonstrate smaller clots than CT or MRI, and obstructed veins may give the "corkscrew appearance". This, however, requires puncture of the femoral artery with a sheath and advancing a thin tube through the blood vessels to the brain where radiocontrast is injected before X-ray images are obtained. It is therefore only performed if all other tests give unclear results or when other treatments may be administered during the same procedure.

=== D-dimer ===
There is an association between the D-dimer blood test and cerebral venous sinus thrombosis. This association however is not strong enough to rule out the diagnosis alone.

=== Further tests ===
In most cases, the direct cause for the cerebral sinus thrombosis is not readily apparent. Identifying a source of infection is crucial; it is common practice to screen for various forms of thrombophilia (a propensity to form blood clots).

== Pathogenesis ==
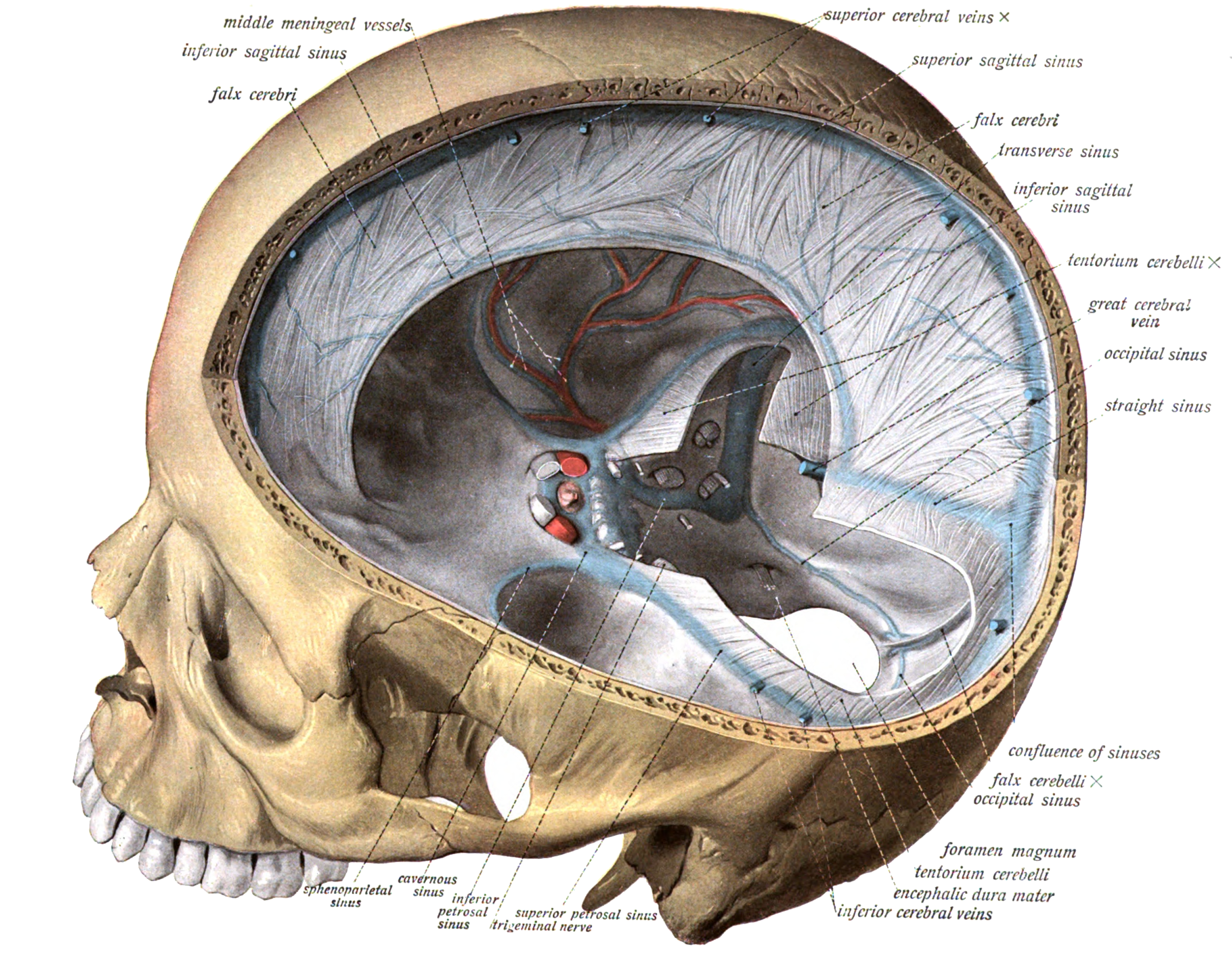
Dural venous sinuses bordered by hard meninges (shown in blue) direct blood outflow from cerebral veins to the internal jugular vein at the base of skull

The veins of the brain, both the superficial veins and the deep venous system, empty into the dural venous sinuses, which carry blood back to the jugular vein and thence to the heart. In cerebral venous thrombosis, blood clots usually form both in the veins of the brain and the venous sinuses. The thrombosis of the veins themselves causes venous infarction (damage to brain tissue due to a congested and therefore insufficient blood supply). This results in cerebral edema (both vasogenic and cytotoxic edema), and leads to small petechial haemorrhages that may merge into large haematomas. Thrombosis of the sinuses is the main mechanism behind the increase in intracranial pressure due to decreased resorption of cerebrospinal fluid (CSF). The condition does not typically lead to hydrocephalus, however, because there is no difference in pressure between various parts of the brain. However, those who have deep cerebral venous sinus thrombosis or oedema at basal ganglia are more prone to hydrocephalus development.

Any blood clot forms due to an imbalance between coagulation (the formation of the insoluble blood protein fibrin) and fibrinolysis. The three major mechanisms for such an imbalance are enumerated in Virchow's triad: alterations in normal blood flow, injury to the blood vessel wall, and alterations in the constitution of blood (hypercoagulability). Most cases of cerebral venous sinus thrombosis are due to hypercoagulability. The inflammatory response and prolonged immobilization of patients with COVID-19 may also help explain the formation of CVST.

It is possible for the clot to break off and migrate (embolise) to the lungs, causing a pulmonary embolism. An analysis of earlier case reports concludes that this occurs in about 10% of cases, but has a very poor prognosis.

Central venous thromboses usually involve the dural sinuses with or without involvement of the cortical veins; isolated cortical venous thromboses are extremely rare with only about 100 cases reported.

== Treatment ==
Various studies have investigated the use of anticoagulation to suppress blood clot formation in cerebral venous sinus thrombosis. Before these trials had been conducted, there had been a concern that small areas of hemorrhage in the brain would bleed further as a result of treatment; the studies showed that this concern was unfounded. Clinical practice guidelines now recommend heparin or low molecular weight heparin in the initial treatment, followed by warfarin, provided there are no other bleeding risks that would make these treatments unsuitable. Some experts discourage the use of anticoagulation if there is extensive hemorrhage; in that case, they recommend repeating the imaging after 7–10 days. If the hemorrhage has decreased in size, anticoagulants are started, while no anticoagulants are given if there is no reduction.

The duration of warfarin treatment depends on the circumstances and underlying causes of the condition. If the thrombosis developed under temporary circumstances (e.g. pregnancy), three months are regarded as sufficient. If the condition was unprovoked but there are no clear causes or a "mild" form of thrombophilia, 6 to 12 months is advised. If there is a severe underlying thrombosis disorder, warfarin treatment may need to continue indefinitely.

Heparin and platelet transfusions should not be used as a treatment for any form of cerebral venous thrombosis caused by immune thrombotic thrombocytopenias including Heparin induced thrombocytopenia (HIT), auto-immune heparin induced thrombocytopenia (aHIT) or vaccine induced immune thrombotic thrombocytopenia (VITT) due to unpredictable effects of heparin on anti-platelet factor-4 antibodies (PF-4). In cases of VITT, intravenous immune globulins (IVIG) are recommended as they block the anti-PF4 antibody interaction with platelets and a non-heparin anticoagulant. In refractory cases, plasma exchange may be used.

Thrombolysis (removal of the blood clot with "clot buster" medication) has been described, either systemically by injection into a vein or directly into the clot during angiography. The 2006 European Federation of Neurological Societies guideline recommends that thrombolysis is only used in people who deteriorate despite adequate treatment, and other causes of deterioration have been eliminated. It is unclear which drug and which mode of administration is the most effective. Bleeding into the brain and in other sites of the body is a major concern in the use of thrombolysis. American guidelines make no recommendation with regards to thrombolysis, stating that more research is needed.

In those where a venous infarct or hemorrhage causes significant compression of surrounding brain structures, decompressive craniectomy is sometimes required. Raised intracranial pressure, if severe or threatening vision, may require therapeutic lumbar puncture (removal of excessive cerebrospinal fluid), or neurosurgical treatment (optic nerve sheath fenestration or shunting). Venous stenting is emerging as a minimally invasive, safer alternative to shunting. In certain situations, anticonvulsants may be used to try to prevent seizures. These situations include focal neurological problems (e.g. inability to move a limb) and focal changes of the brain tissue on CT or MRI scan. Evidence to support or refute the use of antiepileptic drugs as a preventive measure, however, is lacking.

== Prognosis ==
In 2004 the first adequately large scale study on the natural history and long-term prognosis of this condition was reported; this showed that at 16 months follow-up 57.1% of people had full recovery, 29.5%/2.9%/2.2% had respectively minor/moderate/severe symptoms or impairments, and 8.3% had died. Severe impairment or death were more likely in those aged over 37 years, male, affected by coma, mental status disorder, intracerebral hemorrhage, thrombosis of the deep cerebral venous system, central nervous system infection and cancer. A subsequent systematic review of nineteen studies in 2006 showed that mortality is about 5.6% during hospitalisation and 9.4% in total, while of the survivors 88% make a total or near-total recovery. After several months, two thirds of the cases has resolution ("recanalisation") of the clot. The rate of recurrence was low (2.8%).

In children with CVST the risk of death is high. Poor outcome is more likely if a child with CVST develops seizures or has evidence of venous infarction on imaging.

== Epidemiology ==
Cerebral venous sinus thrombosis is rare, with an estimated 3-4 cases per million annual incidence in adults. While it may occur in all age groups, it is most common in the third decade. 75% are female. Given that older studies show no difference in incidence between men and women, it has been suggested that the use of oral contraceptives in women is behind the disparity between the sexes. A 1995 report from Saudi Arabia found a substantially larger incidence at 7 cases per 100,000; this was attributed to the fact that Behçet's disease, which increases risk of CVST, is more common in the Middle East.

A 1973 report found that CVST could be found on autopsy (examination of the body after death) in nine percent of all people. Many of these were elderly and had neurological symptoms in the period leading up to their death, and many developed concomitant heart failure. An estimated 0.3% incidence of CVST in patients infected with SARS-CoV-2.

In children, a Canadian study reported in 2001 that CVST occurs in 6.7 per million annually. 43% occur in the newborn (less than one month old), and a further 10% in the first year of life. Of the newborn, 84% were already ill, mostly from complications after childbirth and dehydration.

== History ==
The first description of thrombosis of the cerebral veins and sinuses is attributed to the French physician Ribes, who in 1825 observed thrombosis of the sagittal sinus and cerebral veins in a man who had had seizures and delirium. Until the second half of the 20th century it remained a diagnosis generally made after death. In the 1940s, reports by Dr Charles Symonds and others allowed for the clinical diagnosis of cerebral venous thrombosis, using characteristic signs and symptoms and results of lumbar puncture.

Improvements on the diagnosis of cerebral venous sinus thrombosis in life were made with the introduction of venography in 1951, which also aided in the distinction from idiopathic intracranial hypertension, which has similar presenting signs and symptoms in many cases.

The British gynecologist Stansfield is credited with the introduction, in 1942, of the just recently introduced anticoagulant heparin in the treatment of CVST in 1942. Clinical trials in the 1990s finally resolved the concern about using anticoagulants in most cases of CVST.

=== COVID-19 vaccine ===
In March 2021, the European Medicines Agency (EMA) announced that out of the around 20 million people who had received the Oxford–AstraZeneca COVID-19 vaccine, general blood clotting rates were normal, but that it had identified seven cases of disseminated intravascular coagulation, and eighteen cases of cerebral venous sinus thrombosis. It had been proposed that inadvertent injection of COVID-19 vaccine into deltoid muscle vasculature may result in vaccine distribution to distant tissues that may be causing these rare adverse reactions. A causal link with the vaccine, however, had not been proven, but the EMA decided to conduct further analysis and to inform recipients of the remote possibility of such rare syndromes. EMA confirmed that the vaccine's benefits still outweigh the risks and later released updated product information. and issued warnings to patients and healthcare professionals. The British Medicines and Healthcare products Regulatory Agency (MHRA) confirmed 79 cases of thrombosis, including 19 fatalities, within the first 20 million vaccinations in Great Britain. Guidelines on management of suspected cases was issued by the British Society for Haematology; it discouraged the use of heparin until it was clearer that heparin would not aggravate the thrombosis. On 13 April 2021 the Centers for Disease Control and Prevention paused the use of the Janssen COVID-19 vaccine in the United States due to six cases of CVST that occurred 6 to 13 days after administration. The recommended pause was lifted on 23 April 2021 following a safety review.

== Notable cases ==
U.S. Secretary of State Hillary Clinton was hospitalized on 30 December 2012, for anticoagulation treatment of venous thrombosis of the right transverse sinus, which is located at the base of the brain. Clinton's thrombotic episode was discovered on an MRI scan done for follow-up of a cerebral concussion she had sustained 2.5 weeks previously, when she fell while suffering from gastroenteritis.
