= Inferior cerebral veins =

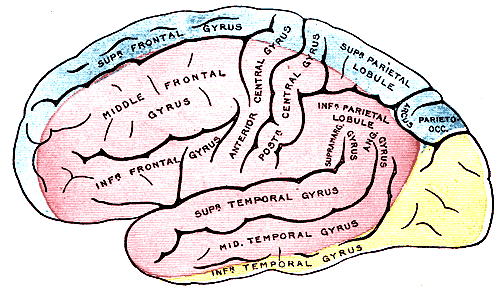
- Outer surface of cerebral hemisphere, showing areas supplied by cerebral arteries (inferior cerebral veins not labeled, but region drained is roughly equivalent to yellow region)

Details
- Drains from: cerebrum
- Drains to: dural venous sinuses
- Artery: cerebral arteries

Identifiers
- Latin: venae inferiores cerebri
- TA98: A12.3.06.013
- TA2: 4911
- FMA: 70869

The inferior cerebral veins are veins that drain the undersurface of the cerebral hemispheres and empty into the cavernous and transverse sinuses.

Those on the orbital surface of the frontal lobe join the superior cerebral veins, and through these open into the superior sagittal sinus.

Those of the temporal lobe anastomose with the middle cerebral and basal veins, and join the cavernous, sphenoparietal, and superior petrosal sinuses.

== Image ==
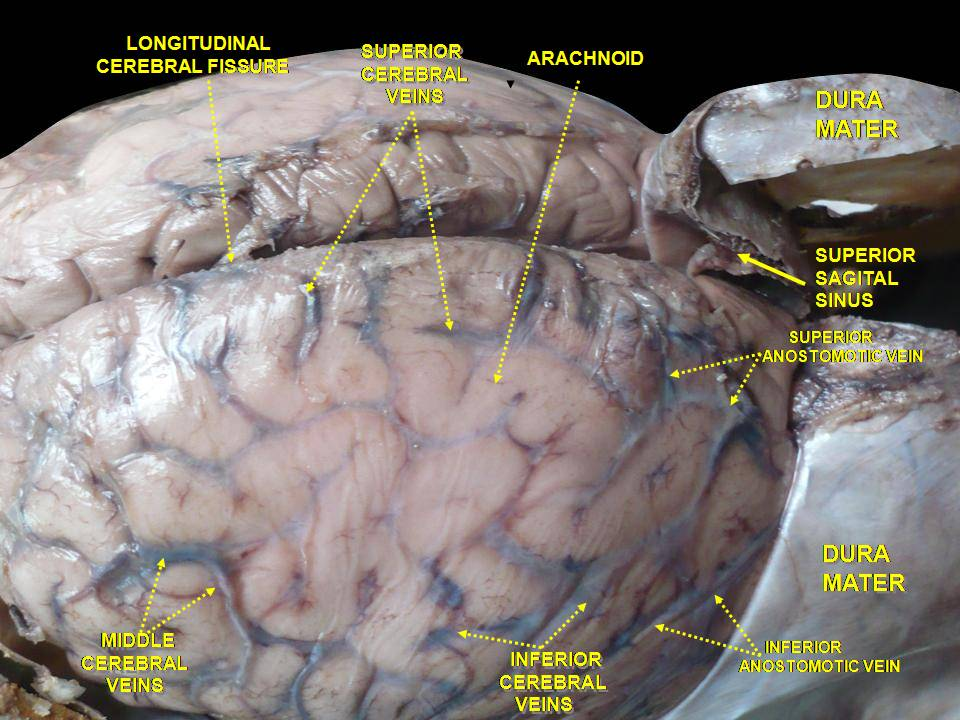
Meninges and superficial cerebral veins. Deep dissection. Superior view.
