= Anastomotic vein =

Anastomotic vein may refer to:

- Inferior anastomotic vein, also known as the vein of Labbé
- Superior anastomotic vein, also known as the vein of Trolard
