= Cerebral veins =

Veins which drain blood from the cerebrum

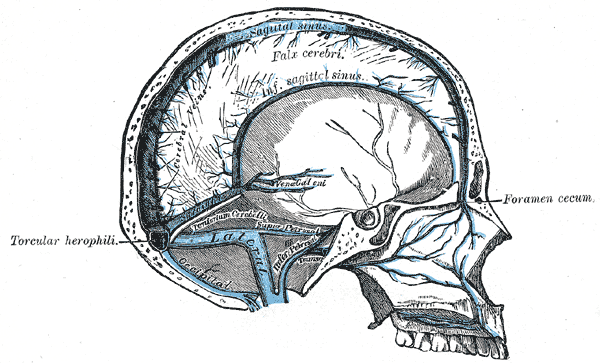
- Sagittal section of the skull, showing the sinuses of the dura. (Cerebral veins labeled at center left.)

Details
- Artery: Cerebral arteries

Identifiers
- Latin: venae encephali, venae cerebri
- MeSH: D002550
- TA98: A12.3.06.001
- TA2: 4901
- FMA: 70861

3D model of cerebral veins

In human anatomy, the cerebral veins are veins in the cerebral circulation which drain blood from the cerebrum of the human brain. They are divisible into external (superficial cerebral veins) and internal (internal cerebral veins) groups according to the outer or inner parts of the hemispheres they drain into.

== External veins ==
The external cerebral veins known as the superficial cerebral veins are the superior cerebral veins, inferior cerebral veins, and middle cerebral veins. The superior cerebral veins on the upper side surfaces of the hemispheres drain into the superior sagittal sinus. The superior cerebral veins include the superior anastomotic vein.

== Internal veins ==
The internal cerebral veins are also known as the deep cerebral veins and drain the deep internal parts of the hemispheres.
