= Empty delta sign =

Radiologic sign

The empty delta sign is a radiologic sign seen on brain imaging which is associated with cerebral venous sinus thrombosis. It is usually seen on magnetic resonance imaging (MRI) or computed tomography (CT) scans with contrast. It is seen as dural wall enhancement in the absence of intra-sinus enhancement (there is no enhancement in the lumen of the dural sinus). This is due to the presence of a blood clot in the dural venous sinuses. The dural venous sinuses drain blood from the brain to the internal jugular veins, which in turn drains blood to the heart. It has been proposed that the empty delta sign occurs in dural venous thromboses due to contrast material filling the dural venous collateral circulation immediately surrounding the dura whilst being unable to fill the intra-dural sinus space due to the presence of a blood clot. The superior sagittal sinus is most commonly affected, but the radiologic sign may also be seen in the transverse sinuses.
