= Charles Labbé =

French surgeon

Charles Labbé (born 8 October 1851 in Merlerault; died 22 October 1889 in Paris) was a French surgeon, . He discovered what is now known as the vein of Labbé (inferior anastomotic vein) in his 3rd year of medical school.

== Biography ==
He was the son of Alexandre Labbé (1823–1888) and Marie Chapey (1830–?), born in a small village in Normandy called Merlerault in the district of Orne, where his father was notary. He entered the medical faculty in Paris in 1871, probably inspired by his uncle, the surgeon Léon Labbé (1832–1916) who is remembered for Labbé's triangle.

On 13 March 1882 Labbé defended his thesis for the medical doctorate. In 1885 he married Marie Eugenie Boussatón (1863–1891). They had one child, Suzanne, born 1889. Charles Labbé died shortly (three weeks) after the birth of his daughter.

In 1879, the article entitled "Note sur la circulation veineuse du cerveau et sur le mode de développement des corpuscules de Pacchioni" was published in the "Archives de Physiologie Normale et Pathologique" (currently known as the Journal of Physiology [Paris]). In a short introduction to this publication, Labbé mentioned that Paul Jules Tillaux (1834–1904) was his supervisor. Tillaux was a famous surgeon, also working at the Beaujon Hospital, who produced publications about the surgical treatment of fractures of the vertebral column, among other subjects. In the body of the article, Labbé described various kinds of intracranial connections of cerebral veins. In his paragraph on the communications between dural sinuses, he reported the presence of the vein that bears his name.
