= Mir-764 microRNA precursor family =

Short RNA molecule

mir-764

Identifiers
- Symbol: mir-764
- Rfam: RF01920
- miRBase family: MIPF0000707

Other data
- RNA type: microRNA
- Domain(s): Eukaryota;
- PDB structures: PDBe

In molecular biology mir-764 microRNA is a short RNA molecule. MicroRNAs function to regulate the expression levels of other genes by several mechanisms.

== Osteoblast Differentiation ==
Expression of the mature miR-764-5p sequence is upregulated during osteoblast differentiation in both skull-specific calvarial and osteoblast progenitor cells. The channel-forming integral protein, CHIP, is regulated by miR-764-5p at its 3'UTR, and there is negative correlation between expression of the two. Increased CHIP levels are observed with inhibition of miR-764-5p, whilst enhanced miR-764-3p expression sees decreased CHIP levels. The differentiation fate of osteoblast progenitor cells is altered by impaired miR-764-3p levels due to CHIP. Osteoblast differentiation from progenitor cells has been shown to be positively regulated by repressed CHIP translation.

== See also ==
- MicroRNA
