= Diploic veins =

Large valveless veins in the skull

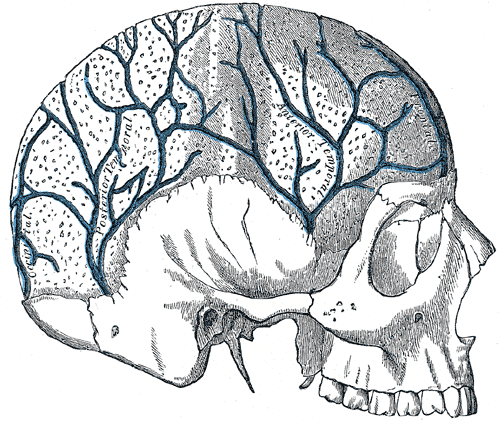
- Veins of the diploë as displayed by the removal of the outer table of the skull.

Details
- Drains from: Diploë

Identifiers
- Latin: venae diploicae
- TA98: A12.3.05.201
- TA2: 4867
- FMA: 50785 70858, 50785

The diploic veins are large, thin-walled valveless veins that channel in the diploë between the inner and outer layers of the cortical bone in the skull, first identified in dogs by the anatomist Guillaume Dupuytren. A single layer of endothelium lines these veins supported by elastic tissue. They develop fully by the age of two years. The diploic veins drain this area into the dural venous sinuses. The four major trunks of the diploic veins found on each side of the head are frontal, anterior temporal, posterior temporal, and occipital diploic veins. They tend to be symmetrical, with the same pattern of large veins on each side of the skull. It has been suggested that the venous patterns they form resemble fingerprints in their individuality.

== Types of diploic veins ==
The frontal, which opens into the supraorbital vein and the superior sagittal sinus.

The anterior temporal, which is confined chiefly to the frontal bone, and opens into the sphenoparietal sinus and into one of the deep temporal veins, through an aperture in the great wing of the sphenoid.

The posterior temporal, which is situated in the parietal bone, and ends in the transverse sinus, through an aperture at the mastoid angle of the parietal bone or through the mastoid foramen.

The occipital, the largest of the four, which is confined to the occipital bone, and opens either externally into the occipital vein, or internally into the transverse sinus or into the confluence of the sinuses (torcular Herophili).

It has been noted that "The tunnels formed by diploic veins are among the few known skeletal markers of soft tissue alteration".

== Functionality ==
The function of diploic veins is unclear. One function that has been suggested is brain cooling. In this account, venous blood from the scalp, cooled by its sweat glands, passes to the pachymeningeal veins by way of the diploic venous system. The diploic venous system in modern humans is more complex and developed than in chimpanzees and this has been suggested to be a consequence of the greater need of the human brain for such cooling.
