= Léon Labbé =

French surgeon and politician

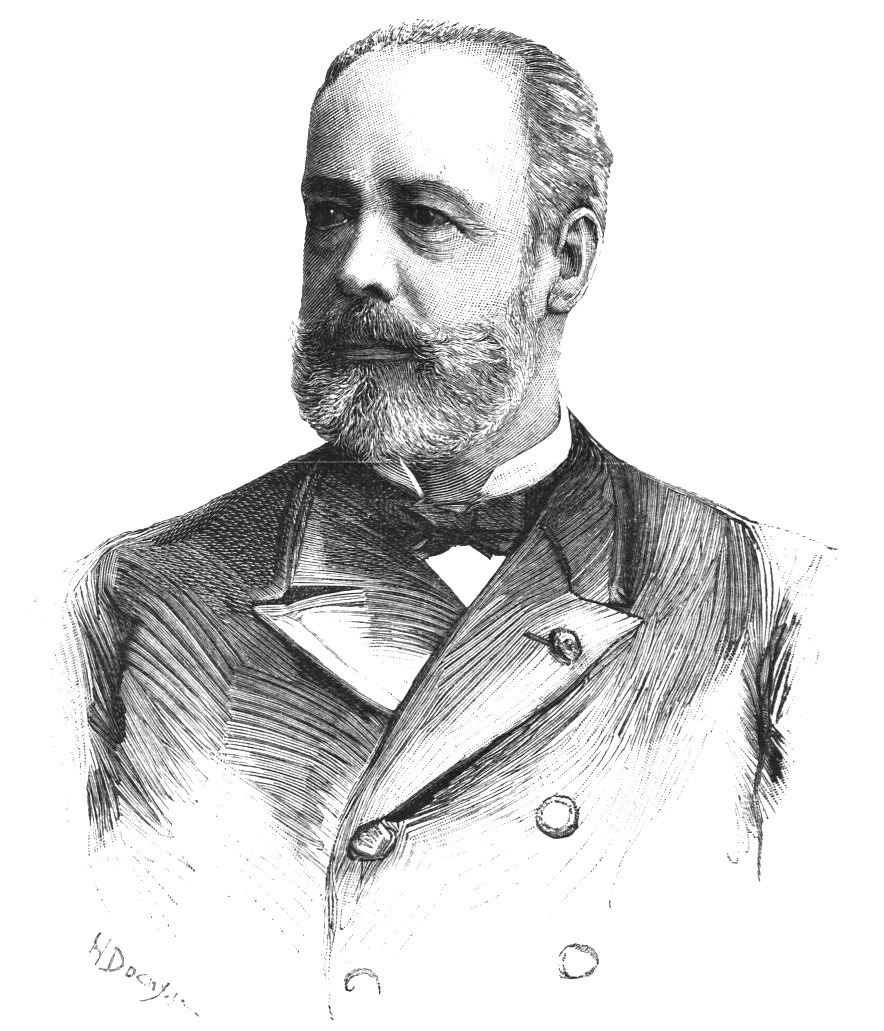
- Léon Labbé in the Journal du Havre illustré hebdomadaire, 15 May 1892
- Born: 29 September 1832; Le Merlerault
- Died: 21 March 1916 (aged 83); 8th arrondissement of Paris
- Education: Faculté de médecine de Paris
- Occupations: Surgeon & Politician

Léon Labbé (29 September 1832 – 21 March 1916) was a French surgeon and politician who was born in the village of Le Merlerault in the department of Orne. He was an uncle to physician Charles Labbé (1851–1889), who first described the inferior anastomotic vein ("vein of Labbé").

From 1856 to 1860 Labbé was a hospital intern in Paris, and in 1861 earned his medical doctorate. Afterwards, he was a surgeon at several hospitals in Paris, including the Hôpital Beaujon, where he was chief-surgeon for many years. In 1879 he became a member of the Académie de Médecine.

In 1892 he was elected to the Senate representing the department of Orne. In this role, he introduced various laws of interest to the medical community, including the 1914 Loi Labbé (Labbé Law), legislation that provided compulsory anti-typhoid vaccinations for French soldiers.

== Associated eponym ==
- Labbé triangle: Location where the stomach is normally in contact with the abdominal wall.
