= Sphenoparietal sinus =

Vein channel in the brain

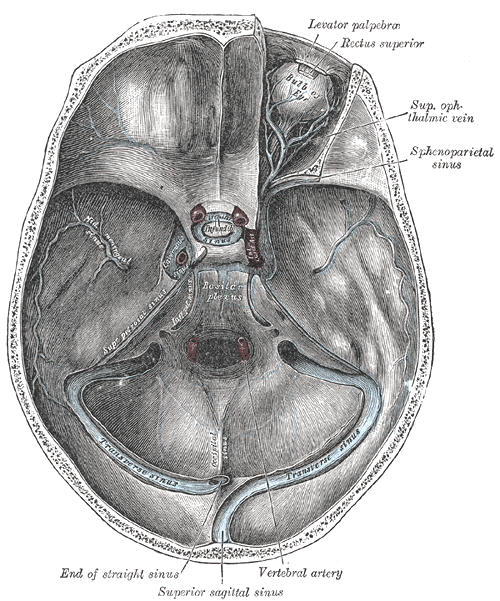
- The sinuses at the base of the skull. (Sphenoparietal sinus labeled at upper right.)

Details
- Drains from: Superficial middle cerebral vein (by tradition)
- Source: Diploic veins, meningeal veins
- Drains to: Cavernous sinus

Identifiers
- Latin: sinus sphenoparietalis
- TA98: A12.3.05.119
- TA2: 4861
- FMA: 50776

The sphenoparietal sinus is a paired dural venous sinus situated along the posterior edge of the lesser wing of either sphenoid bone. It drains into the cavernous sinus.

== Anatomy ==
A sphenoparietal sinus is situated under each lesser wing of the sphenoid bone near the posterior edge of this bone, between the anterior cranial fossa and middle cranial fossa. It terminates by draining into the anterior part of the cavernous sinus.

=== Tributaries ===
A sphenoparietal sinus receives small veins from the adjacent dura and sometimes the frontal ramus of the middle meningeal vein, communicating rami from the superficial middle cerebral vein, temporal lobe veins, and the anterior temporal diploic veins.

== Additional images ==
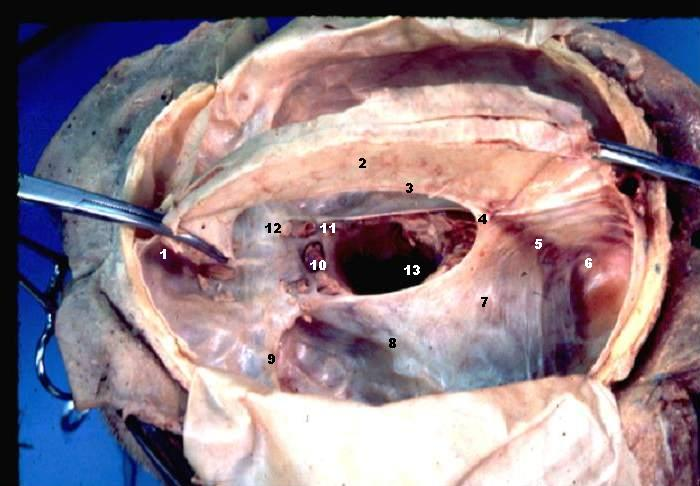
Human brain dura mater (reflections)
