= Calvaria (skull) =

Top part of the skull

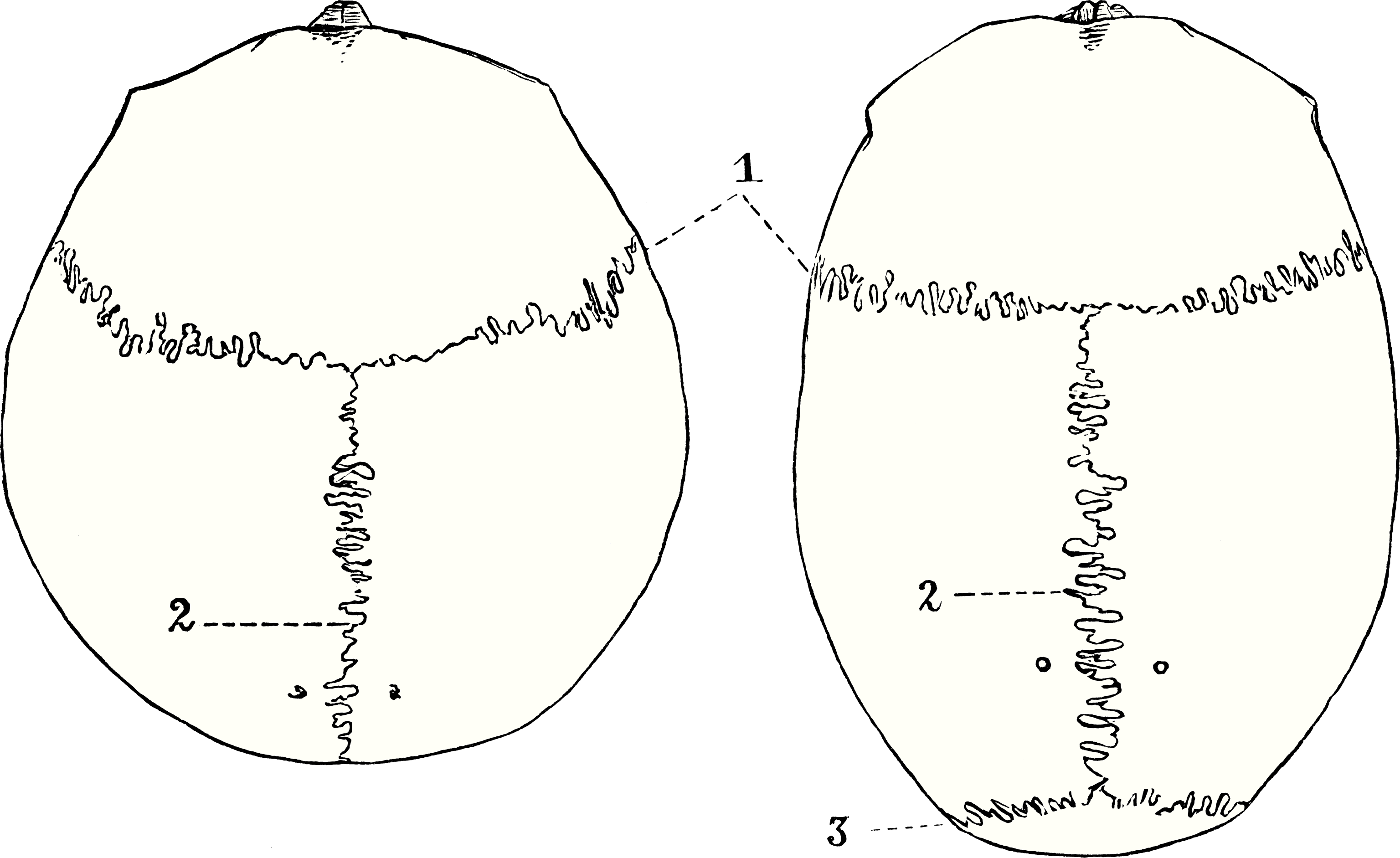

Details

Identifiers
- Latin: calvaria
- TA98: A02.1.00.032
- TA2: 436
- FMA: 52800

The calvaria is the top part of the skull. It is the superior part of the neurocranium and covers the cranial cavity containing the brain. It forms the main component of the skull roof.

The calvaria is made up of the superior portions of the frontal bone, occipital bone, and parietal bones. In the human skull, the sutures between the bones normally remain flexible during the first few years of postnatal development, and fontanelles are palpable. Premature complete ossification of these sutures is called craniosynostosis.

In Latin, the word calvaria is used as a feminine noun with plural calvariae; however, many medical texts incorrectly list the word as calvarium, a neuter Latin noun with plural calvaria.

== Structure ==
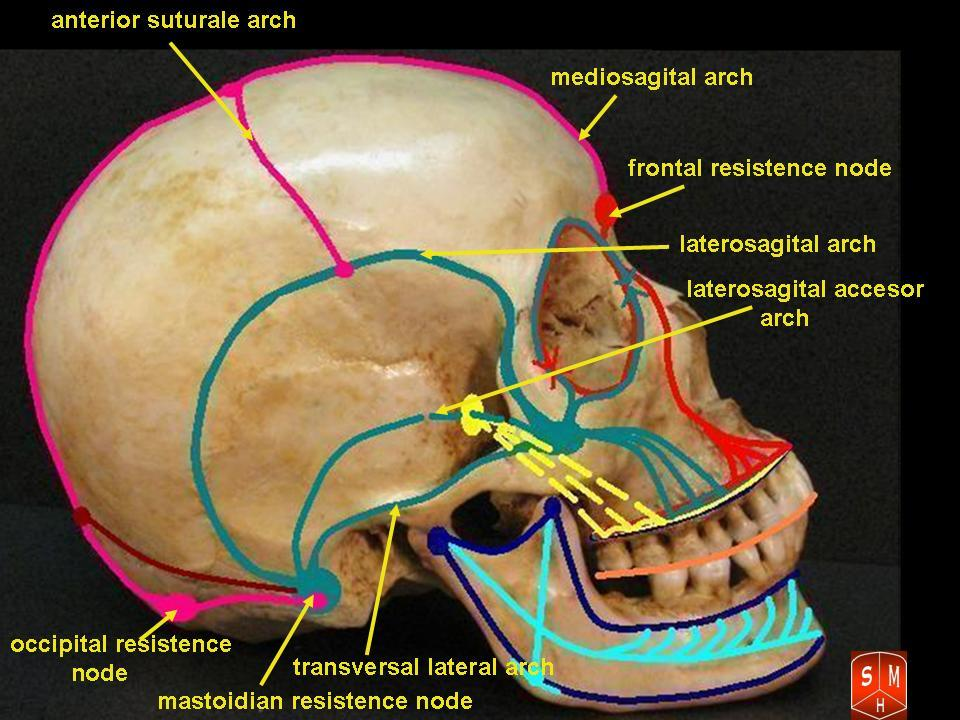
Resistance structures of calvaria

The outer surface of the skull possesses a number of landmarks. The point at which the frontal bone and the two parietal bones meet is known as the bregma. The point at which the two parietal bones and the occipital bone meet is known as the lambda. Not only do these landmarks indicate the fontanelle in newborns, they also act as reference points in medicine and surgery.

The inner surface of the skull-cap is concave and presents depressions for the convolutions of the cerebrum, together with numerous furrows for the lodgement of branches of the meningeal vessels. Along the middle line is a longitudinal groove, narrow in front, where it commences at the frontal crest, but broader behind; it lodges the superior sagittal sinus, and its margins afford attachment to the falx cerebri. On either side of it are several depressions for the arachnoid granulations, and at its back part, the openings of the parietal foramina when these are present.

It is crossed in front by the coronal suture and behind by the lambdoid suture, while the sagittal suture lies in the medial plane between the parietal bones.

=== Layers ===
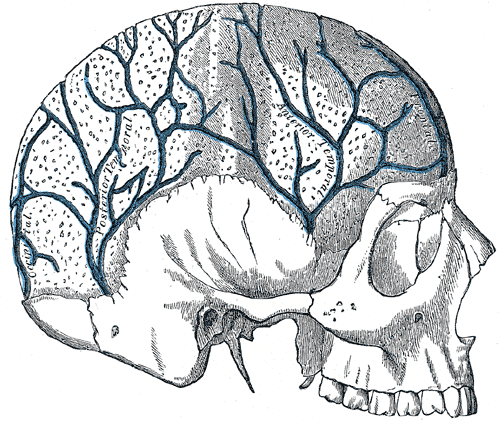
The outer layer of the skull has been removed and shows the diploic veins and inner layer.

Most bones of the calvaria consist of internal and external tables or layers of compact bone, separated by diploë. The diploë is cancellous bone containing red bone marrow during life, through which run canals formed by diploic veins. The diploë in a dried calvaria is not red because the protein was removed during preparation of the cranium. The internal table of bone is thinner than the external table, and in some areas there is only a thin plate of compact bone with no diploë. Calvarial bones are supplied by endosteal and periosteal sheaths which are innervated by the nociceptors, sensory, sympathetic, and parasympathetic nerves. Horizontal section of the mouse pups showed that the density of nerve fibers was highest in the region of forehead, temples, and the back of head which crossing the frontal, parietal, and interparietal bones. In the calvarial innervation in the adult mouse, CGRP-labeled fibers and peripherin were seen in the sutures, emissary canals, and bone marrow but not in diploe. Nerve fibers passing through the emissary canals and cavity of bone marrow provided the branches of periosteal and dural nerves whereas fibers from the sutures gave out to the dural nerves.

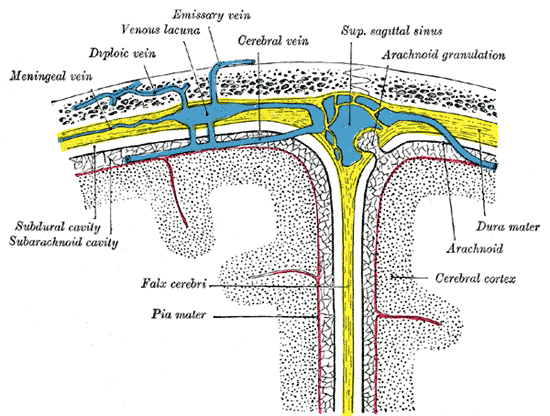

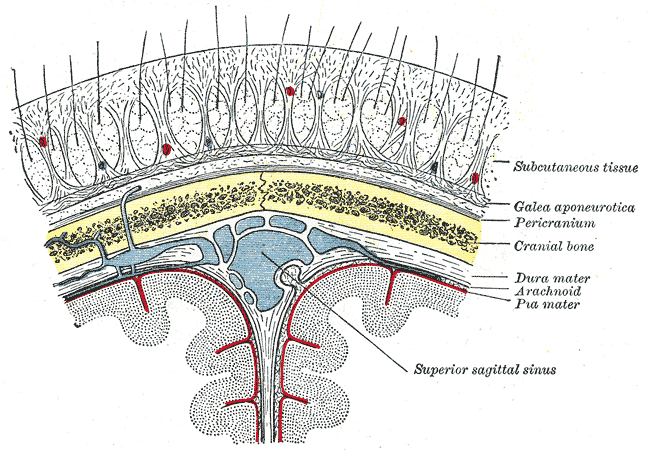

== Development ==
In the fetus, the formation of the calvaria involves a process known as intramembranous ossification.

== In popular culture ==
In many translations of the Gospels, Jesus is killed in a place named "Calvary", a reference to this body part.
