= Diploë =

Bone in the skull

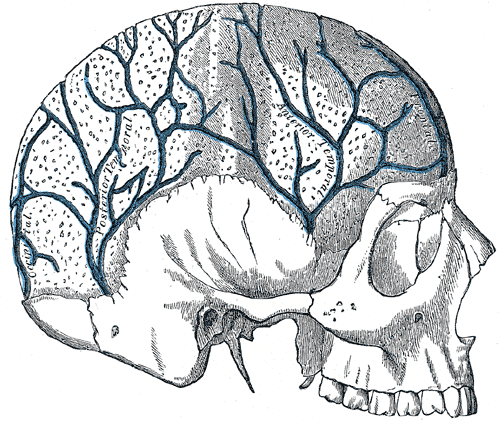
- Veins of the diploë as displayed by the removal of the outer table of the skull.

Details
- Vein: Diploic veins

Identifiers
- Latin: diploe
- TA98: A02.1.00.035
- TA2: 438
- FMA: 76630

Diploë (/ˈdɪploʊi/ or DIP-lo-ee) is the spongy cancellous bone separating the inner and outer layers of the cortical bone of the skull. It is a subclass of trabecular bone.

In the cranial bones, the layers of compact cortical tissue are familiarly known as the tables of the skull; the outer one is thick and tough; the inner is thin, dense, and brittle, and hence is termed the vitreous table. The intervening cancellous tissue is called the diploë. In certain regions of the skull, this becomes absorbed so as to leave spaces filled with liquid between the two tables.

== Etymology ==
From Ancient Greek διπλόη (diplóē, “literally, a fold”), noun use of feminine of διπλόος (diplóos, “double”)
