= Inferior anastomotic vein =

Blood vessel

Details

Identifiers
- Latin: vena anastomotica inferior
- TA98: A12.3.06.010
- TA2: 4910
- FMA: 51239

The inferior anastomotic vein (also known as the vein of Labbe) is one of several superficial cerebral veins. It is a large, highly variable vein extending across the lateral hemispheric surface of the temporal lobe to form an anastomosis between the superficial middle cerebral vein and transverse sinus, opening into either at either end. It drains adjacent cortical regions, gathering tributaries from minor veins of the temporal lobe.

== History ==
It was named after the 19th century French surgeon Charles Labbé (1851–1889), the nephew of the surgeon and politician Léon Labbé (1832–1916).

== See also ==
- Superior anastomotic vein

== Additional images ==
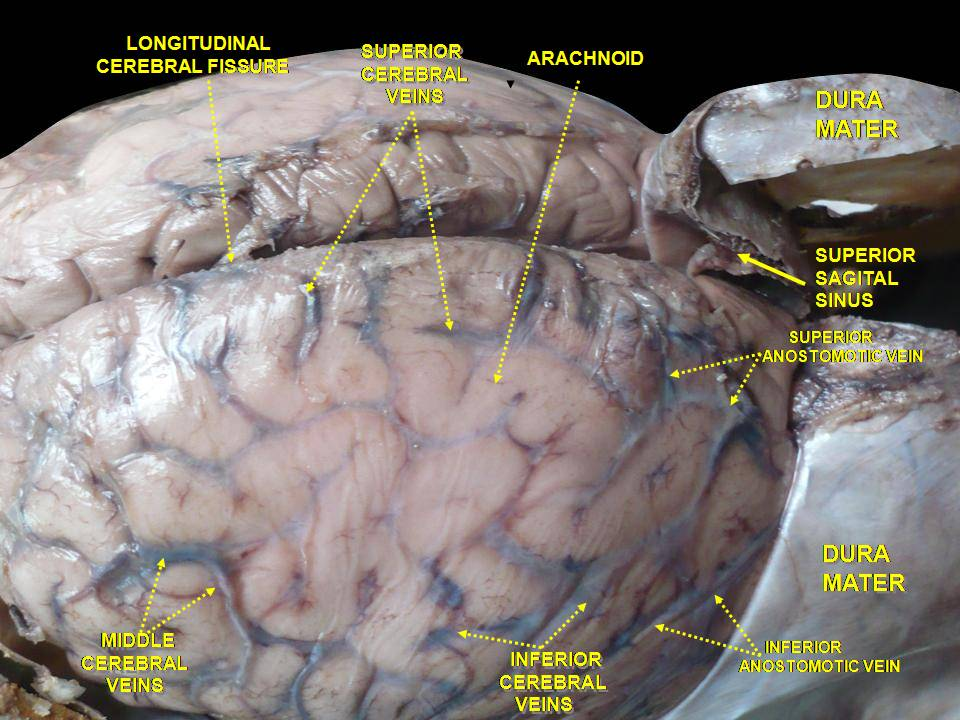
Meninges and superficial cerebral veins. Deep dissection. Superior view.

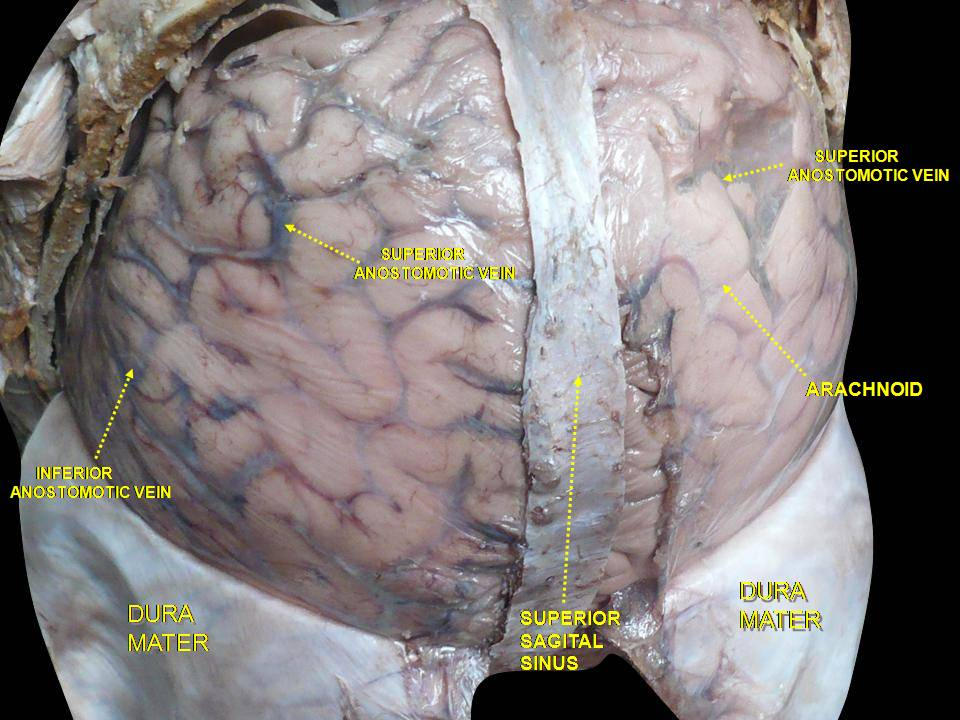
Meninges and superficial cerebral veins. Deep dissection. Superior view.
