= Middle cerebral veins =

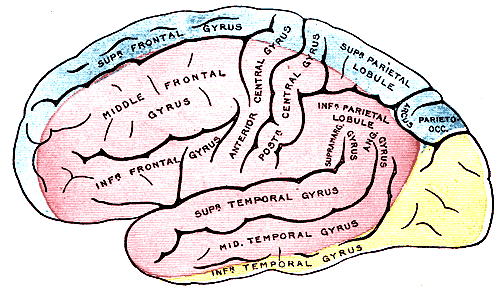
- Outer surface of cerebral hemisphere, showing areas supplied by the cerebral arteries. (Middle cerebral veins not labeled, but region drained is roughly equivalent to pink region.)

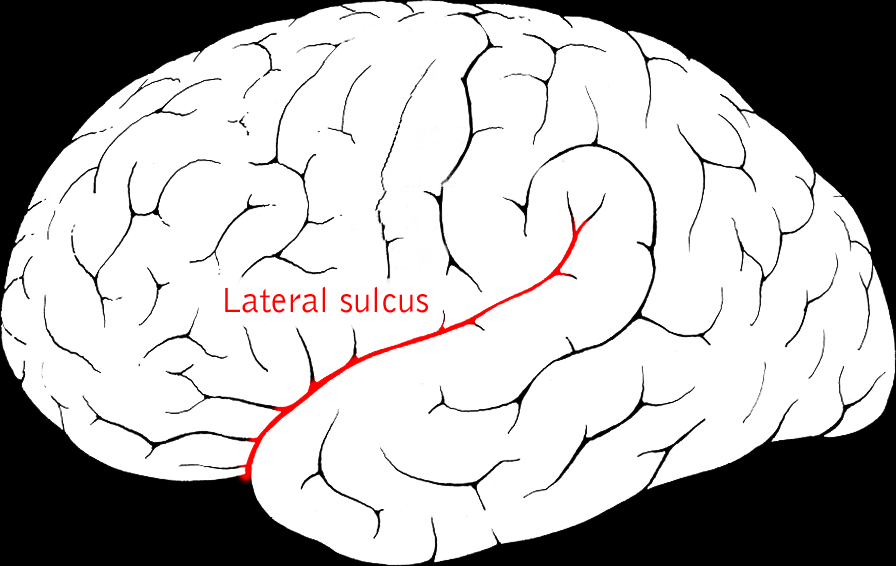
- Lateral sulcus (Middle cerebral veins not visible, but veins run in lateral sulcus.)

Details
- Drains to: Cavernous sinus, basal vein
- Artery: Middle cerebral artery

Identifiers
- Latin: venae mediae cerebri (superficialis et profunda)

The middle cerebral veins - are the superficial and deep veins - that run along the lateral sulcus. The superficial middle cerebral vein is also known as the superficial Sylvian vein, and the deep middle cerebral vein is also known as the deep Sylvian vein. The lateral sulcus or lateral fissure, is also known as the Sylvian fissure.

== Superficial middle cerebral vein ==
The superficial middle cerebral vein (superficial Sylvian vein) begins on the lateral surface of the hemisphere. It runs along the lateral sulcus to empty into either the cavernous sinus, or the sphenoparietal sinus. It is adherent to the deep surface of the arachnoid mater bridging the lateral sulcus. It drains the adjacent cortex.

=== Anastomoses ===
At its posterior extremity, the superficial middle cerebral vein is connected with the superior sagittal sinus via the superior anastomotic vein, and with the transverse sinus via the inferior anastomotic vein.

== Deep middle cerebral vein ==
The deep middle cerebral vein (deep Sylvian vein) receives tributaries from the insula and neighboring gyri, and runs in the lower part of the lateral sulcus.

== Additional images ==
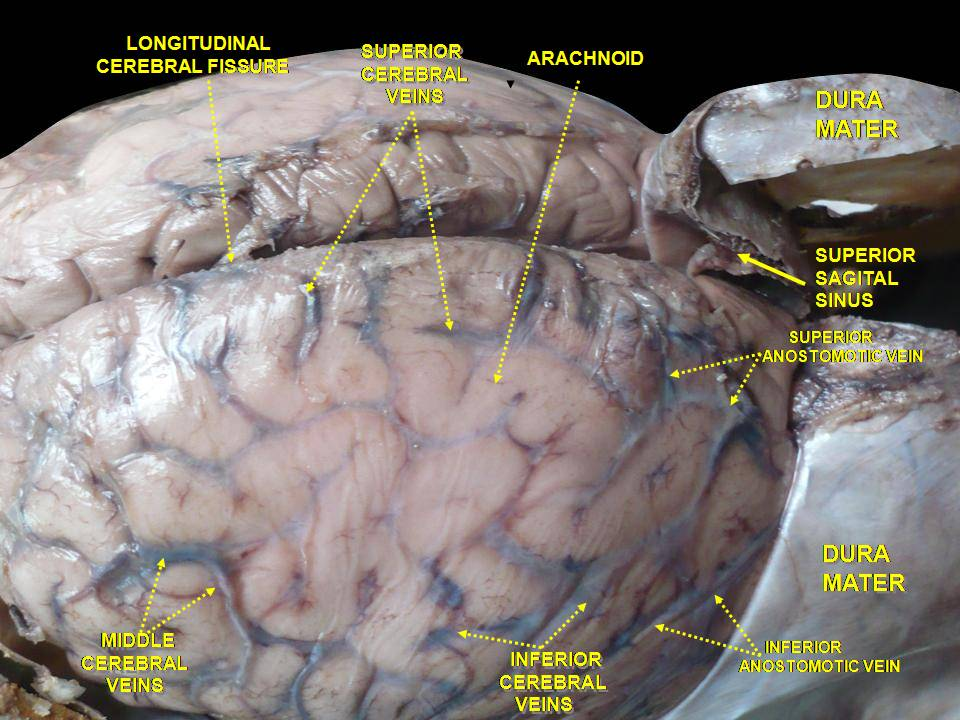
Meninges and superficial cerebral veins. Deep dissection. Superior view.

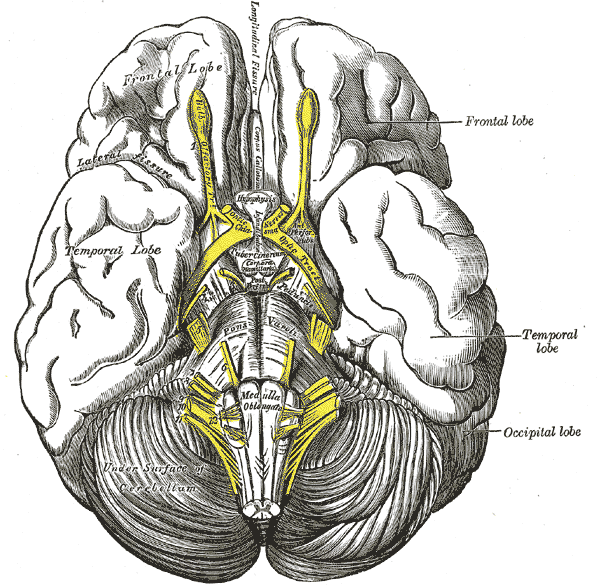
Base of brain. (Lateral fissure visible at top left.)

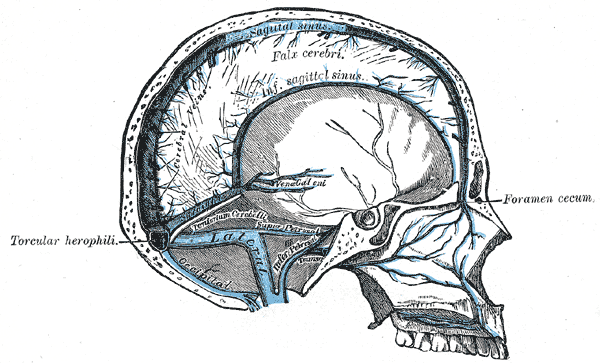
Sagittal section of the skull, showing the sinuses of the dura. (Cerebral veins labeled at center left.)
