= Superior anastomotic vein =

Details

Identifiers
- Latin: vena anastomotica superior
- TA98: A12.3.06.012
- TA2: 4909
- FMA: 51238

The superior anastomotic vein, also known as the vein of Trolard, is a superficial cerebral vein grouped with the superior cerebral veins. The vein was named after the 18th-century anatomist Jean Baptiste Paulin Trolard. The vein anastomoses with the middle cerebral vein and the superior sagittal sinus.

== Additional images ==
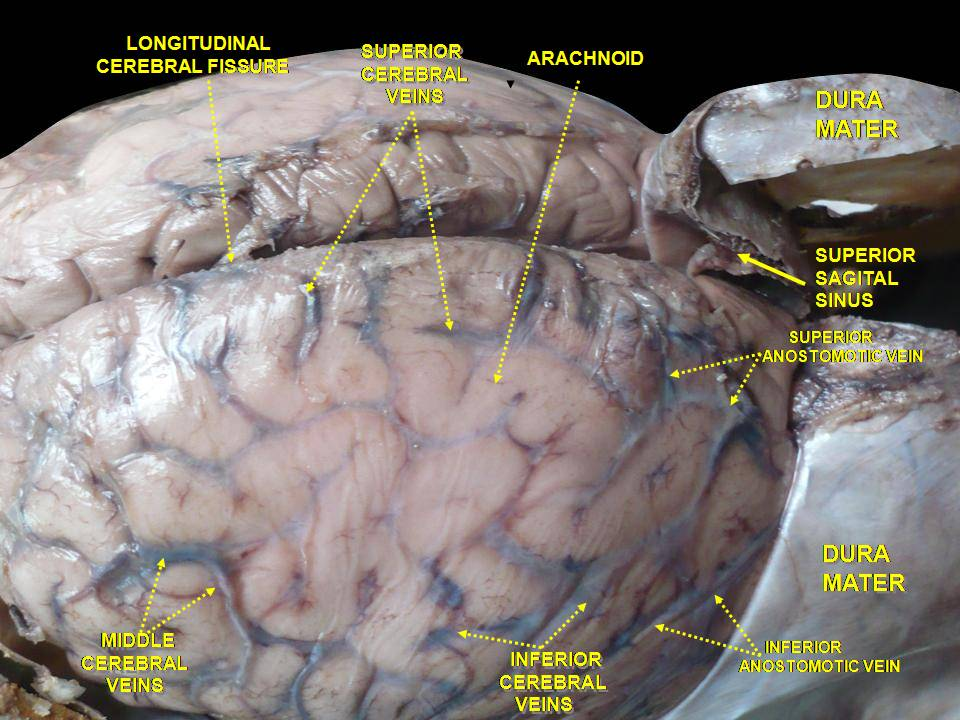
Meninges and superficial cerebral veins. Deep dissection. Superior view.

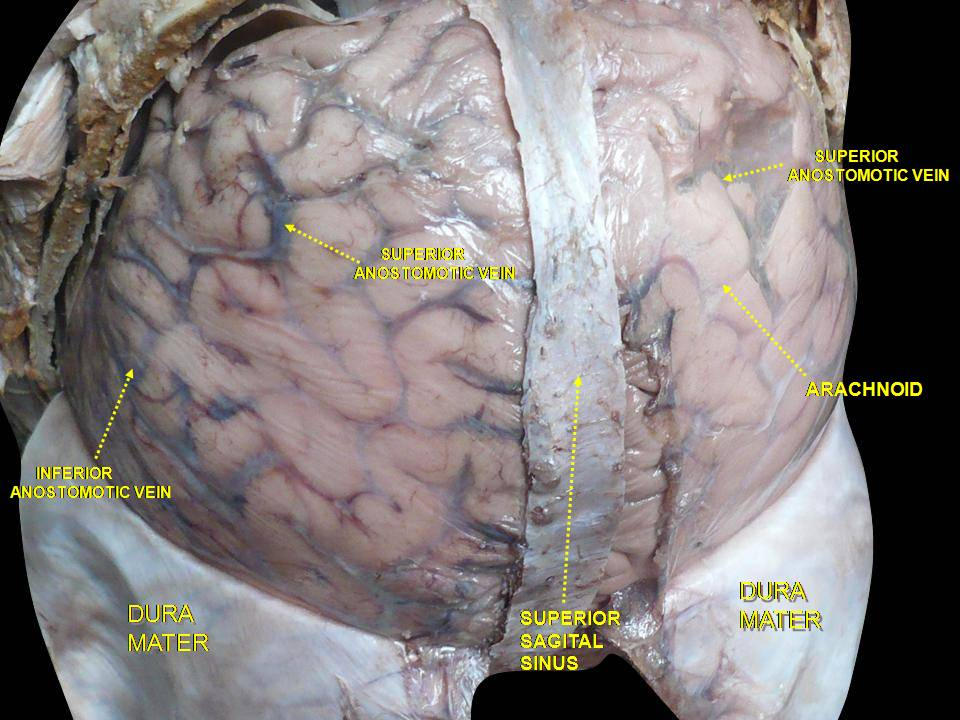
Meninges and superficial cerebral veins. Deep dissection. Superior view.
