= Superior cerebral veins =

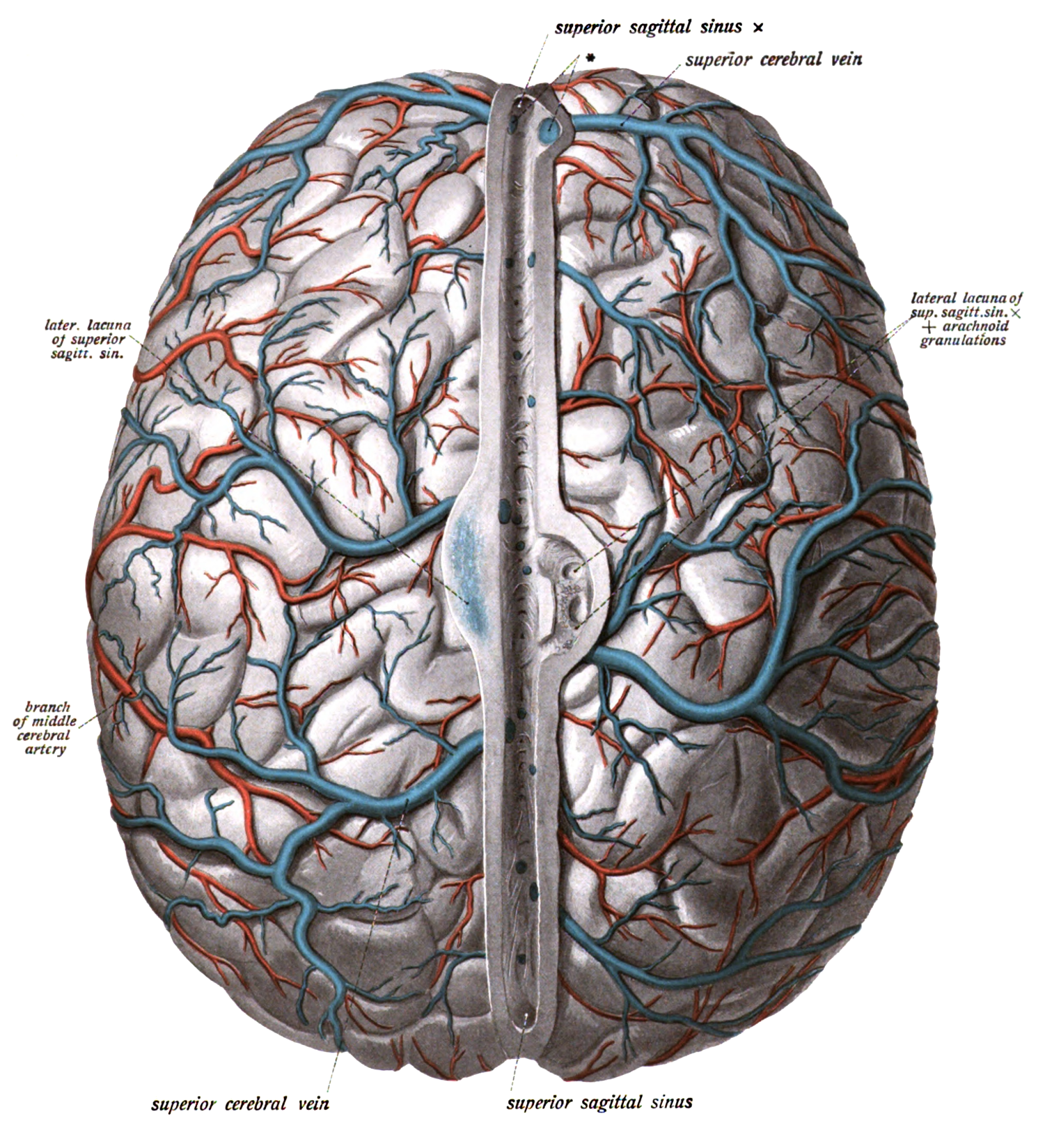
- Various cerebral veins visible.

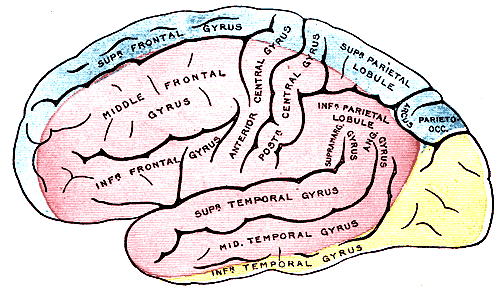
- Outer surface of cerebral hemisphere, showing areas supplied by cerebral arteries. (Superior cerebral veins not labeled, but region drained is roughly equivalent to blue region.)

Details
- Drains to: Superior sagittal sinus
- Artery: Cerebral arteries

Identifiers
- Latin: venae cerebri superiores
- TA98: A12.3.06.003
- TA2: 4903
- FMA: 70863

The superior cerebral veins are several cerebral veins that drain the superolateral and superomedial surfaces of the cerebral hemispheres into the superior sagittal sinus. There are 8-12 cerebral veins. They are predominantly found in the sulci between the gyri, but can also be found running across the gyri.

== Anatomy ==
=== Fate ===
The superior cerebral veins drain into the superior sagittal sinus individually. The anterior veins run at near right angles to the sinus while the posterior and larger veins are directed at oblique angles, opening into the sinus in a direction opposed to the current (anterior to posterior) of the blood contained within it.

== Additional images ==
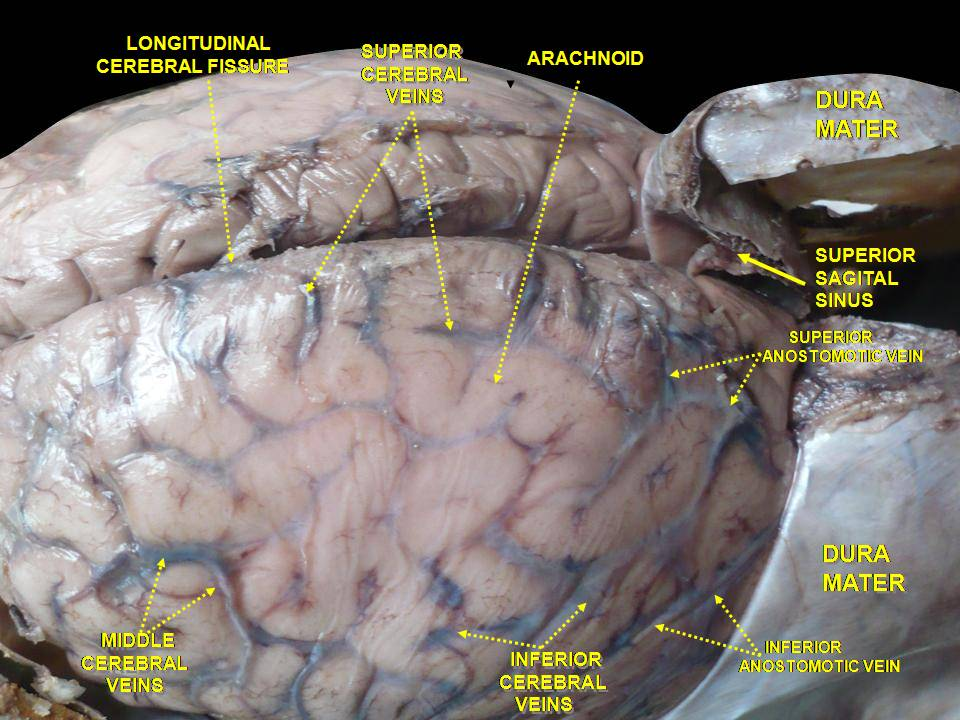
Meninges and superficial cerebral veins. Deep dissection. Superior view.
