= Superior sagittal sinus =

Vein channel in the brain

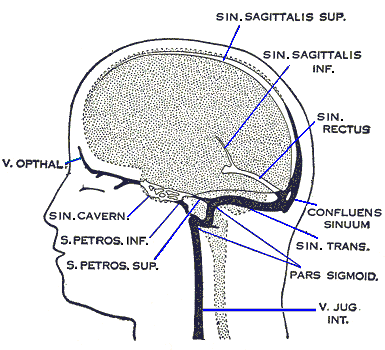
- Dural veins (superior sagittal sinus at top, labeled "sin. sagittalis sup." for Latin sinus sagittalis superior)

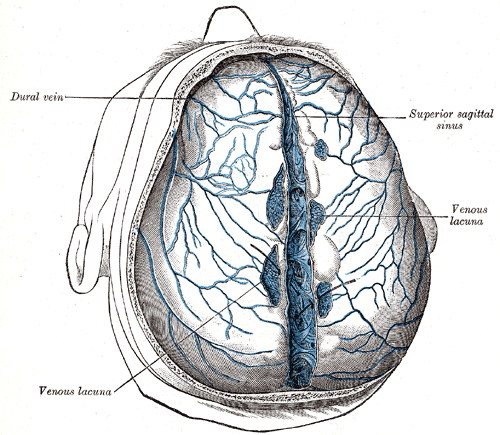
- Superior sagittal sinus laid open after removal of the skull cap. The chordae Willisii are clearly seen. The venous lacunæ are also well shown; from two of them probes are passed into the superior sagittal sinus.

Details
- Drains from: Superior cerebral veins
- Drains to: Confluence of sinuses

Identifiers
- Latin: sinus sagittalis superior
- MeSH: D054063
- TA98: A12.3.05.109
- TA2: 4856
- FMA: 50767

The superior sagittal sinus (also known as the superior longitudinal sinus), within the human head, is an unpaired dural venous sinus lying along the attached margin of the falx cerebri. It allows blood to drain from the lateral aspects of the anterior cerebral hemispheres to the confluence of sinuses. Cerebrospinal fluid drains through arachnoid granulations into the superior sagittal sinus and is returned to the venous circulation.

== Structure ==
It is triangular in section. It is narrower anteriorly, and gradually increases in size as it passes posterior-ward.

It commences at the foramen cecum, through which it receives emissary veins from the nasal cavity. It passes posterior-ward along its entire course. It is accommodated within a groove which runs across the inner surface of the frontal bone, the adjacent margins of the two parietal lobes, and the superior division of the cruciate eminence of the occipital lobe. Near the internal occipital protuberance, it deviates to either side (usually the right) before draining into the confluence of sinuses, continuing as the corresponding transverse sinus.

The superior sagittal sinus is usually divided into three parts: anterior (foramen cecum to bregma), middle (bregma to lambda), posterior (lambda to confluence).

Its inner surface presents the openings of the superior cerebral veins, which run, for the most part, obliquely forward, and open chiefly at the back part of the sinus, their orifices being concealed by fibrous folds; numerous fibrous bands (chordae Willisii) extend transversely across the inferior angle of the sinus; and, lastly, small openings communicate with irregularly shaped venous spaces (venous lacunae, also called 'lateral lacunae' or 'lacunae laterales') in the dura mater near the sinus.

=== Venous lacunae ===
There are usually three lacunae on either side of the sinus: a small frontal, a large parietal, and an occipital, intermediate in size between the other two.

Most of the cerebral veins from the outer surface of the hemisphere open into these lacunae, and numerous arachnoid granulations (Pacchionian bodies) project into them from below.

=== Tributaries ===
The superior sagittal sinus receives the superior cerebral veins, veins from the diploë and dura mater, and, near the posterior extremity of the sagittal suture, veins from the pericranium, which pass through the parietal foramina.

== Function ==
Cerebrospinal fluid drains through arachnoid granulations into the superior sagittal sinus and is returned to venous circulation.

== Additional images ==
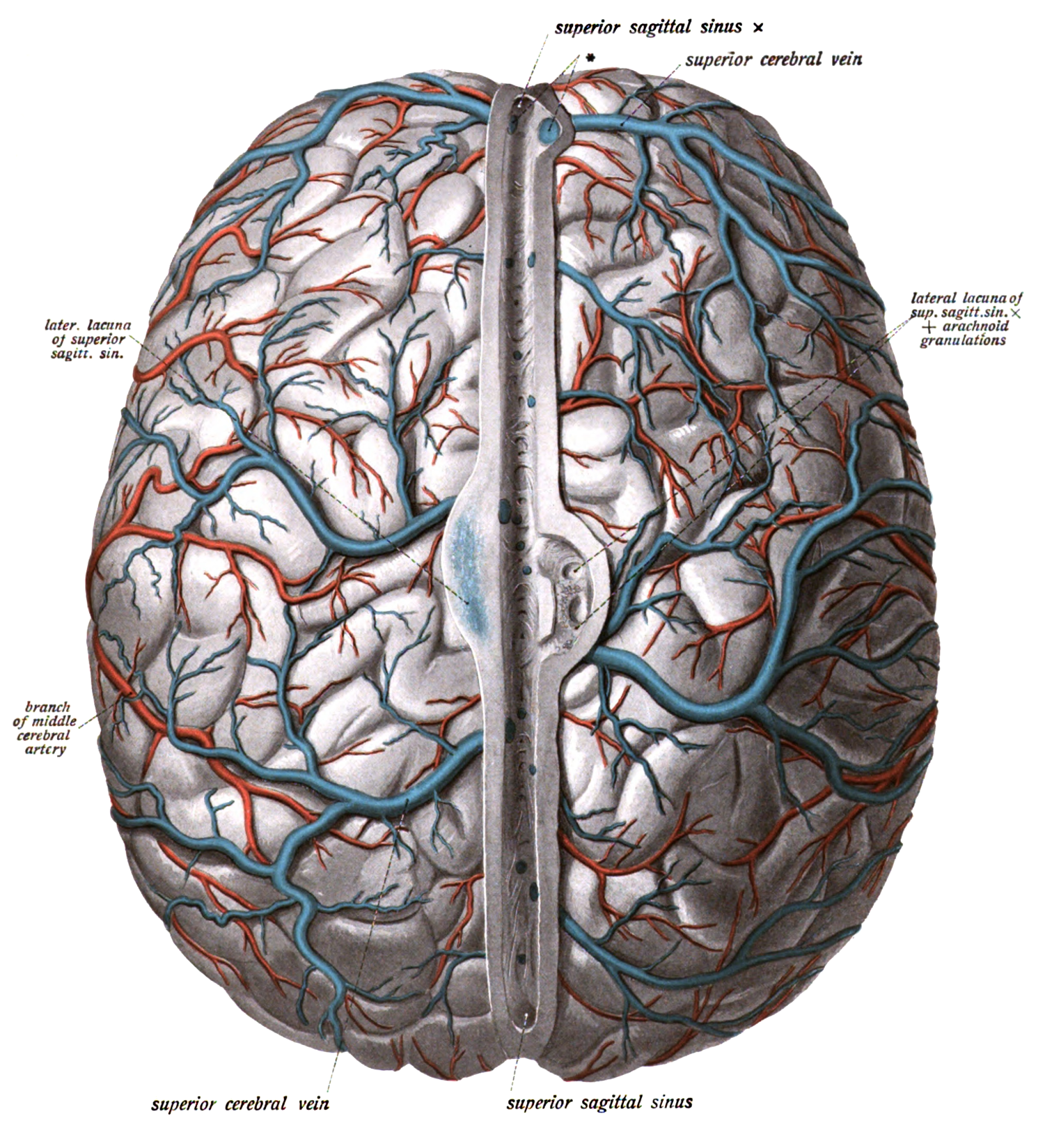
Brain with sagittal sinus at centre, with various lacunae.

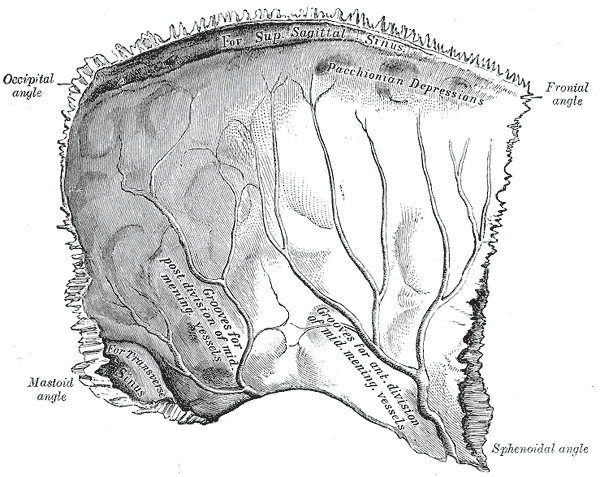
Left parietal bone. Inner surface.

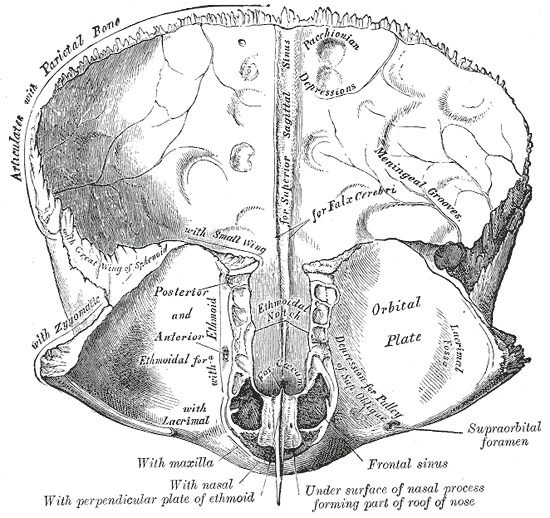
Frontal bone. Inner surface.

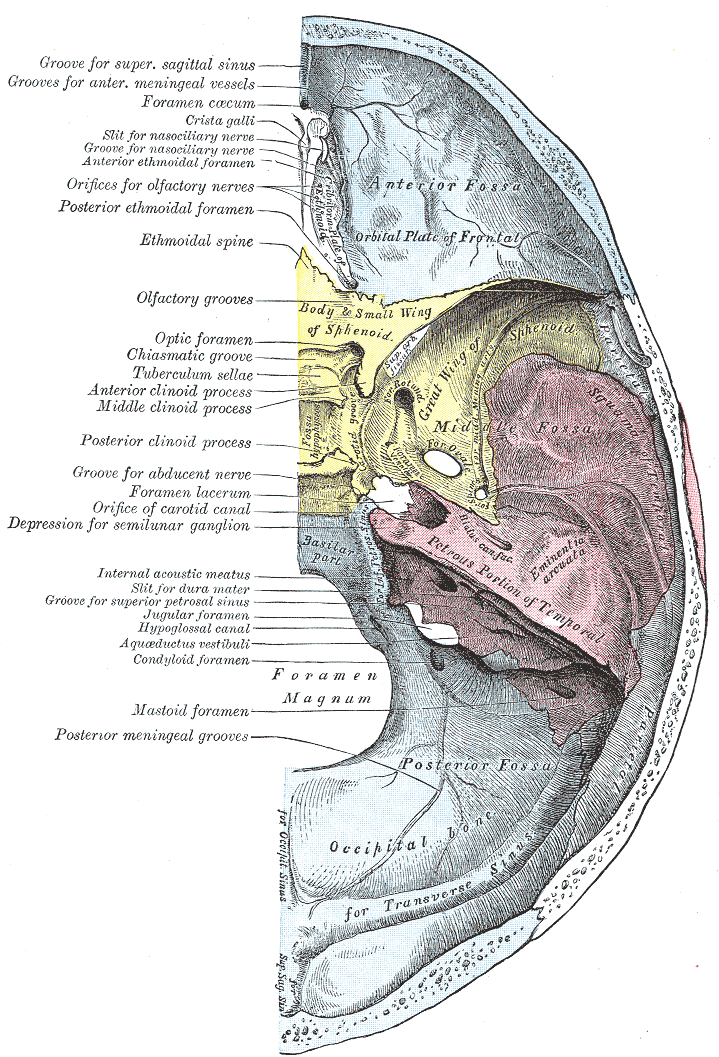
Base of the skull. Upper surface.

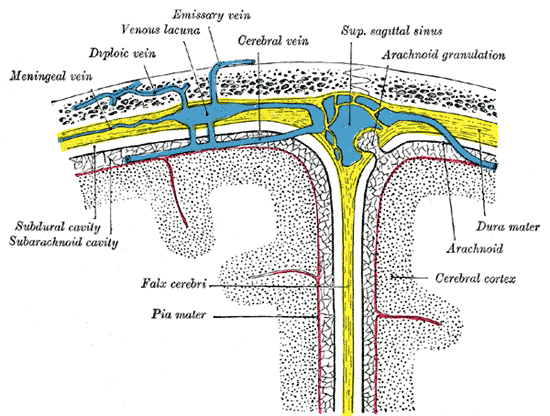
Diagrammatic representation of a section across the top of the skull, showing the membranes of the brain, etc.

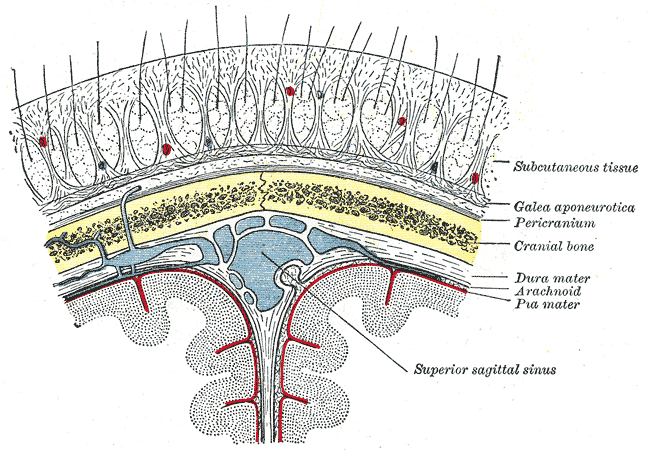
Diagrammatic section of scalp.

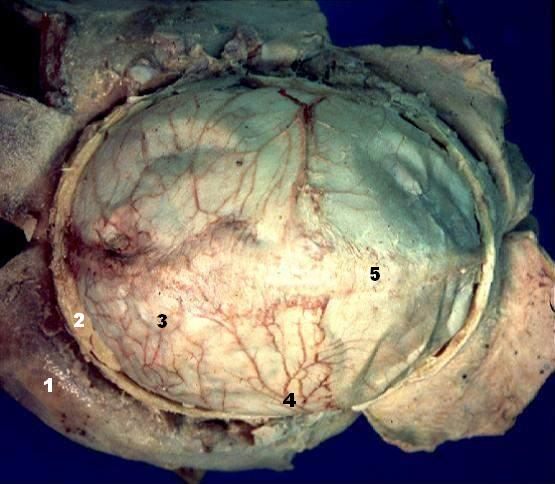
Human brain dura mater

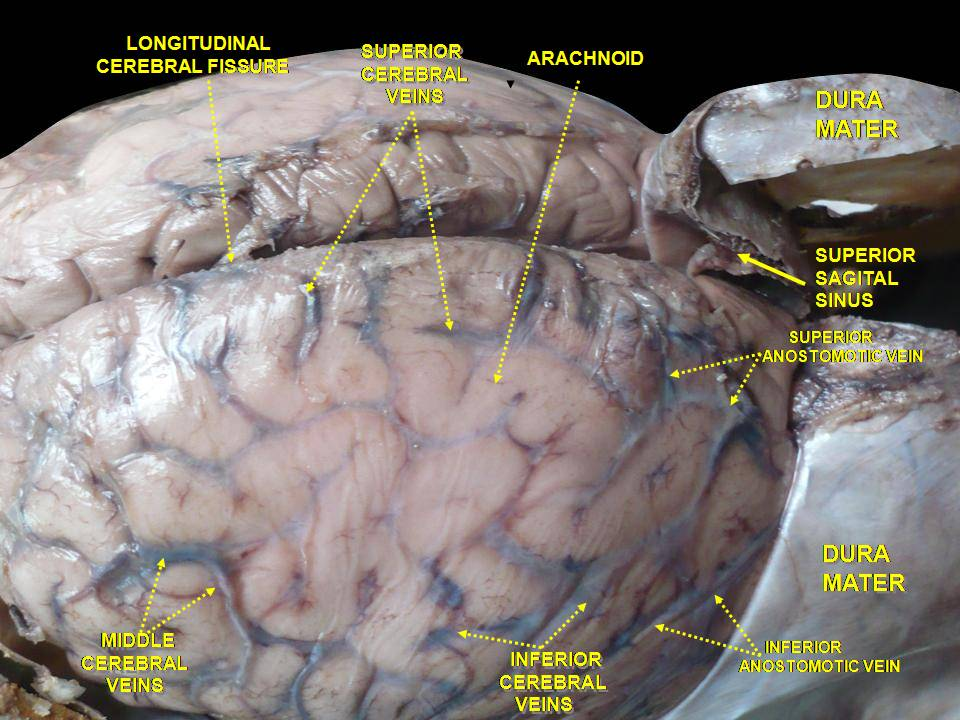
Meninges and superficial cerebral veins. Deep dissection. Superior view.

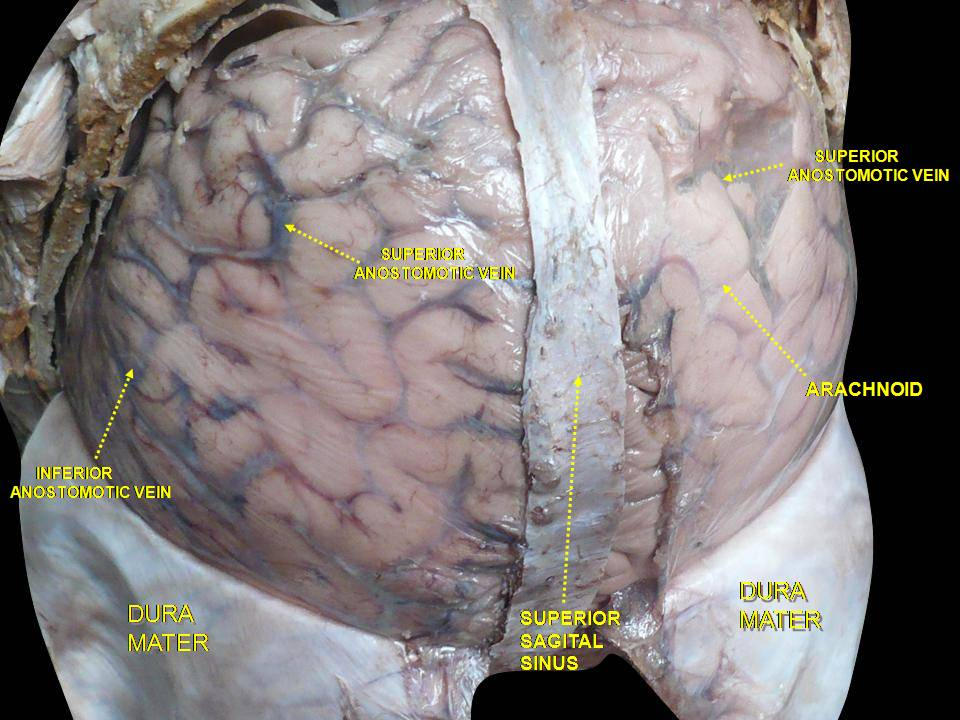
Meninges and superficial cerebral veins. Deep dissection. Superior view.

== See also ==
- Inferior sagittal sinus
- Superficial veins of the brain
